= Conurbation =

Group of settlements linked by continuous urban area

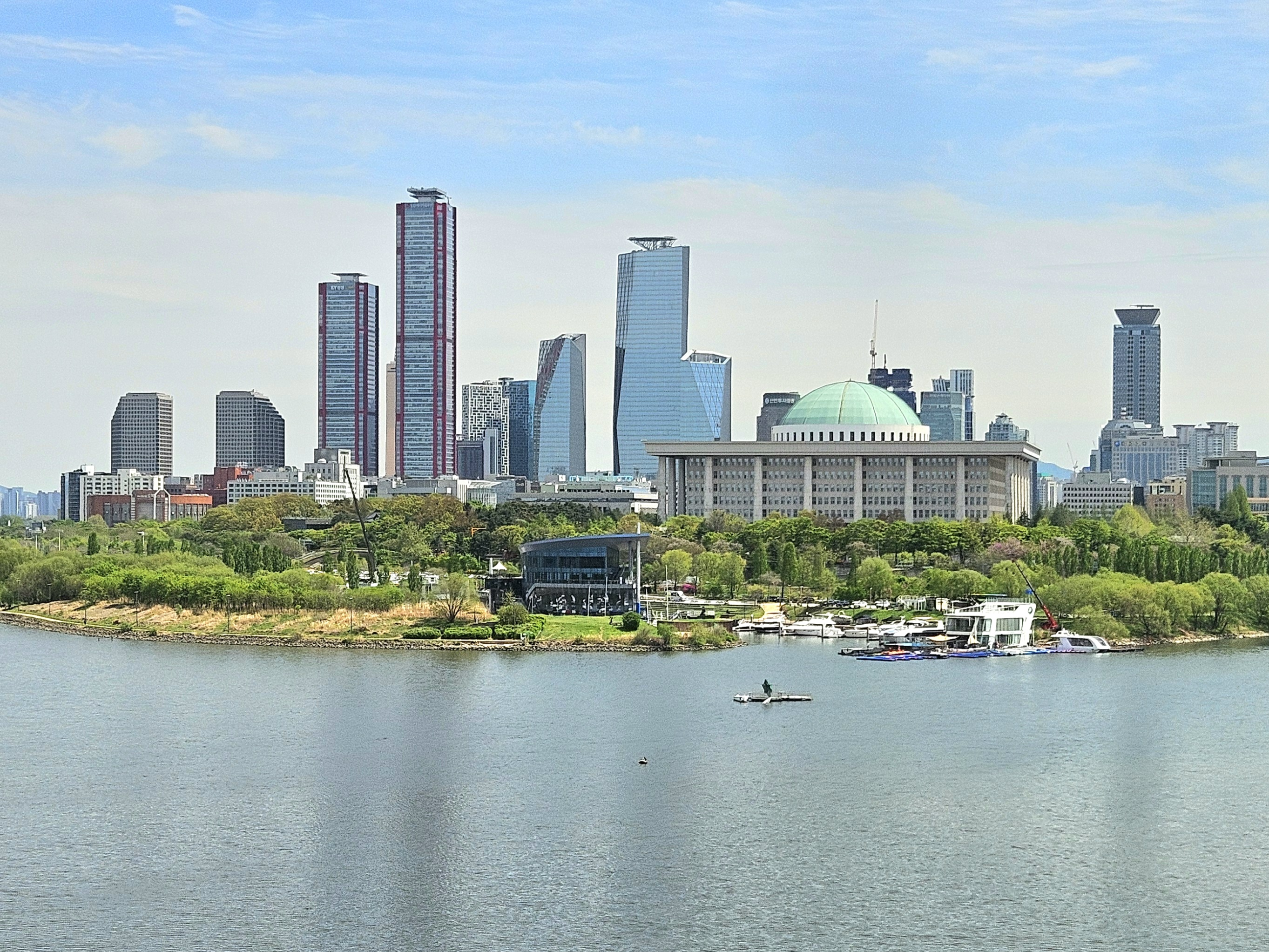
Skyscrapers of Seoul, South Korea

A conurbation is a region consisting of a number of metropolises, cities, large towns, and other urban areas which, through population growth and physical expansion, have merged to form one continuous urban or industrially developed area. In most cases, a conurbation is a polycentric urbanised area in which transportation has developed to link areas. They create a single urban labour market or travel to work area.

Conurbations often emerged in coal-mining regions during the period of the Industrial Revolution. Patrick Geddes coined the term in his book Cities in Evolution (1915). He drew attention to the ability of the new technology at the time of electric power and motorised transport to allow cities to spread and agglomerate together, and gave as examples "Midlandton" in England, the Ruhr in Germany, Randstad in the Netherlands, and the Northeastern Seaboard in the United States.

For census purposes, the term as described is used in Britain, whereas in the United States a related concept of metropolitan area is used instead. Each polycentric "metropolitan area" may have its own common designation such as San Francisco Bay Area or the Dallas–Fort Worth metroplex. Internationally the term "urban agglomeration" is often used to convey a similar meaning to "conurbation".

A conurbation is different from a megalopolis in that the urban areas of a megalopolis are close but not physically contiguous, and labor markets have not yet merged. The region structure should also be contrasted with a megacity, as a megacity is hierarchical with a dominant urban core, whereas a conurbation is polycentric and no single urban centre has the dominant role over all other centres.

== Africa ==
=== Algeria ===
The capital city of Algiers forms a massive conurbation with the surrounding cities of Blida, Boumerdès, and Tipaza. This continuous urban area, often referred to as the Greater Algiers metropolitan region (Le Grand Alger), has merged through extensive suburban expansion, shared transportation networks, and industrial corridors along the Mitidja plain, creating an integrated economic hub with a population exceeding 8 million.

=== Congo-Democratic Republic of Congo ===
The capital cities of Kinshasa in the Democratic Republic of the Congo and Brazzaville in the Republic of the Congo form a conurbation.

=== Morocco ===
In Rabat-Salé-Kénitra administrative region, the capital city of Rabat and the city of Salé, both located at the mouth of the river Bou Regreg, form a conurbation.

=== Nigeria ===
Lagos is a conurbation formed through the merged development of the initial Lagos city area with other cities and towns including Ikeja and Ojo. Also various suburban communities such as Agege, Alimosho, Ifako-Ijaiye, Kosofe, Mushin, Oshodi, and Shomolu are included in the area.

=== South Africa ===
Johannesburg, Ekurhuleni (East Rand), and Tshwane (greater Pretoria) merged to form a region that has a population of 14.6 million.

== Asia ==
=== Bangladesh ===
The city of Dhaka is linked with Narayanganj and Gazipur; there are no gaps between Dhaka and the two cities. This conurbation which consists of the areas of the city of Dhaka and its surrounding cities and towns is collectively knowns as the Greater Dhaka City. The city of Dhaka is the core city of the conurbation and has a population of about 10 million. The satellite cities of the conurbation include Narayanganj, Gazipur, Tongi, Fatullah, Keraniganj, Tarabo, and Kaliganj.

=== China ===
There are 3 well-known conurbations in China.

- The Yangtze River Delta consisting of Shanghai, Nanjing, Hangzhou, and Ningbo houses 150 million people and in 2016 it generated $2.76 trillion, 20 percent of China's national GDP. It is responsible for one-third of China's imports and exports.
- The Jingjinji, consisting of Tianjin, Beijing, Tangshan, and Qinhuangdao houses an estimated 130 million people and is responsible for a GDP of $1.1 trillion.
- The Pearl River Delta including Guangzhou, Shenzhen, Dongguan, Hong Kong, and Macau houses 60 million people and is responsible for a GDP of $1.5 trillion, 9% of China's national GDP.

=== India ===
The Mumbai Metropolitan Region (MMR) consists of Mumbai and its satellite towns. Developing over a period of about 20 years, it consists of seven municipal corporations and fifteen smaller municipal councils. The region has an area of 4,355 km^{2} and with a population of 20.5 million, and is among the top ten most populated urban agglomerations in the world. It is linked together through the Mumbai Suburban Railway system and a large network of roads.

The National Capital Region (NCR) is a name for the coordinated planning region which encompasses the entire National Capital Territory of Delhi as well as several surrounding districts in the neighbouring states of Uttar Pradesh, Haryana and Rajasthan. However, the conurbation of Delhi is actually limited to the NCT of Delhi and the neighbouring contiguous urban areas comprising Gurgaon, Faridabad, Noida, Greater Noida and Ghaziabad. The area is officially known as the Central National Capital Region (CNCR), a small part of overall NCR. The population of this conurbation was estimated 21.7 million in 2011. It is the world's third most populous urban agglomeration.

The Amaravati Metropolitan Region (AMR) of Andhra Pradesh is a conurbation of three cities, namely Vijayawada, Eluru and Guntur and 11 other towns which include Mangalagiri, Tadepalle, Tenali, Ponnuru, Chilakaluripeta, Narasaraopeta, Sattenapally, Nandigama, Jaggayyapeta, Nuzividu, Gudivada and Vuyyuru. The new capital city of the state, Amaravati, is being developed between the cities of Vijayawada and Guntur at the center of the conurbation. The region holds a total population of 5.8 million.

The Jamshedpur Metropolitan Area has Greater Jamshedpur and it contains the area and city of Adityapur, Maango, and Jugsalai.

=== Indonesia ===
Greater Jakarta or Jabodetabek comprises the largest urban area in Indonesia and the second-largest in the world with a population of around 30 million. The center and national capital, Jakarta, has a population of 10.3 million within its borders.

The second-most populated city in Indonesia, Surabaya, also forms a conurbation known as Gerbangkertosusila with a metropolitan population of about 10 million compared to the city proper of 3 million. Conurbations are also present around Bandung and Medan.

== Europe ==
=== Germany ===
The Ruhr region (Ruhrgebiet) is a major conurbation located in the federal state of North Rhine-Westphalia. It consists of several large cities of similar size — including Dortmund, Essen, Duisburg, Bochum, Gelsenkirchen, and Oberhausen — that have gradually grown together to form a continuous urban area. With no single dominant core city, the Ruhr represents a classical polycentric conurbation. It developed as a major coal and steel industrial center during the 19th and 20th centuries, and remains one of the most densely urbanized regions in Europe.

The Ruhr covers an area of approximately 4,438 km^{2} (1,714 sq mi) and has a population of around 5.1 million people as of 2023. Unlike the broader Rhine-Ruhr metropolitan region, which includes both conurbations and monocentric metropolitan areas such as Cologne, the Ruhr region itself is specifically characterized by its polycentric, conurbation structure.

=== The Netherlands ===
The Randstad ("Rim City" or "Edge City") is a roughly crescent- or arc-shaped conurbation in the Netherlands, that includes almost half the country's population. With a central-western location, it connects and comprises the Netherlands' four biggest cities (Amsterdam, Rotterdam, The Hague, and Utrecht), their suburbs, and many towns in between, that all grew and merged into each other. Among other things, it includes the Port of Rotterdam (the world's busiest seaport outside Asia), the Port of Amsterdam (Europe's fourth-busiest seaport), and Amsterdam Airport Schiphol. With a population of approximately 8.4 million people it is one of the largest metropolitan regions in Europe, comparable in population size to the Rhine-Ruhr metropolitan region or the San Francisco Bay Area, and covers an area of approximately 11,372 km^{2} (4,391 sq mi). The Randstad had a gross regional domestic product of €510 billion in 2022, making it the second most productive region in the European Union, only behind the Paris metropolitan area. It encompasses both the Amsterdam metropolitan area and Rotterdam–The Hague metropolitan area.

=== United Kingdom ===
Industrial and housing growth in the United Kingdom during the 19th and early 20th centuries produced many conurbations. Greater London is by far the largest urban area and is usually counted as a conurbation in statistical terms, but differs from the others in the degree to which it is focused on a single central area. In the mid-1950s the Green Belt was introduced to stem the further urbanisation of the countryside in South East England.

Different organisations define conurbations in the UK differently for example, the Liverpool–Manchester or the Manchester–Liverpool conurbation is defined as one conurbation by AESOP in a comparison report published by the University of Manchester in 2005 found here. The Liverpool–Manchester Conurbation has a population of 5.68 million.

== North America ==
=== Canada ===
==== Golden Horseshoe (Ontario) ====
The Golden Horseshoe is a densely populated and industrialized region centred on the west end of Lake Ontario in Southern Ontario, Canada. The largest cities in the region are Toronto, Mississauga, Brampton, Hamilton, Oakville, Burlington, St. Catharines, and Niagara Falls. If metropolitan areas (which are somewhat distinct from the core urban area of the Golden Horseshoe by about 30 to 50 km of less developed and semi-rural land) are included (similar to Combined Metropolitan Statistical Areas in the United States as defined by United States Office of Management and Budget), the total population is 8.8 million people. This is slightly over a quarter (25.6%) of the population of Canada, approximately 75% of Ontario's population, and one of the largest metropolitan areas in North America.

The larger area is named the Greater Golden Horseshoe and includes the metropolitan areas of Kitchener (including adjacent cities it is often referred to as Waterloo Region), Barrie, Guelph, Peterborough, and Brantford. The Greater Golden Horseshoe is also part of the Windsor-Quebec Corridor and its southeastern boundary is across the Niagara River from the Buffalo–Niagara Falls metropolitan area in the United States.

The Golden Horseshoe in turn includes smaller conurbations. For example, Kitchener, Waterloo and Cambridge, the three cities in Southern Ontario (located halfway from London to Toronto), although administratively independent, have a unified urban transit system (including ION light rail transit) and multiple public services under the umbrella of the Waterloo Region, rather than each having their own. The region in turn has multiple connections with neighboring regions, reaching as far as to Guelph in the east and Stratford in the west (for example, the International Languages program in WCDSB is available to children from those neighboring cities, as they do not offer such programs of their own).

==== Greater Montreal (Quebec) ====
Greater Montreal is Canada's second-largest conurbation. Statistics Canada defines the Census Metropolitan Area (CMA) as having 4,258.31 square kilometres (1,644.14 mi^{2}) and a population of 3,824,221 as of 2011, which represents almost half of the population of the province of Quebec. Slightly smaller, there are 82 municipalities grouped under the Montreal Metropolitan Community to coordinate issues such as land planning, transportation, and economic development.

==== Lower Mainland (British Columbia) ====
British Columbia's Lower Mainland is the most populated area in Western Canada. It consists of many mid-sized contiguous urban areas, including Vancouver, North Vancouver (city and district municipality), West Vancouver, Burnaby, New Westminster, Richmond, Surrey, and Coquitlam, among others. The Lower Mainland population is around 2.5 million (as of 2011) and the area has one of the highest growth rates on the continent of up to 9.2 percent from the 2006 census.

==== Ottawa-Gatineau / National Capital Region ====
The National Capital Region (NCR) is made up of the capital, Ottawa, and neighbouring Gatineau which is located across the Ottawa River. As Ottawa is in Ontario and Gatineau is in Quebec, it is a unique conurbation. Federal government buildings are located in both cities and many workers live in one city and work in the other. The National Capital Region consists of an area of 5,319 square kilometres that straddles the boundary between the provinces of Ontario and Quebec. The area of the National Capital Region is very similar to that of the Ottawa-Gatineau Census Metropolitan Area (CMA) although the National Capital Region contains a number of small neighbouring communities that are not contained within the CMA. When all the communities are included, the population of the area is about 1,500,000. Ottawa-Gatineau is the only CMA in the nation to fall within two provinces and is the fourth largest.

=== Mexico ===
==== Mexico City (CDMX) ====
The "CDMX" is the most densely populated center in North America. Greater Mexico City refers to the conurbation around Mexico City, officially called Valley of Mexico Metropolitan Area (Zona Metropolitana del Valle de México or ZMVM), constituted by Mexico City itself composed of 16 Municipalities—and 41 adjacent municipalities of the states of Mexico and Hidalgo. However, for normative purposes, Greater Mexico City most commonly refers to the Metropolitan Area of the Valley of Mexico, an agglomeration that incorporates 18 additional municipalities. As of 2019 an estimated 27,782,000 people lived in Greater Mexico City, making it the largest metropolitan area in North America. It is surrounded by thin strips of highlands which separate it from other adjacent metropolitan areas, of which the biggest are Puebla, Toluca, and Cuernavaca-Cuautla. Together those areas make up the Mexico City megalopolis.

==== Guadalajara Metropolitan Area (Zona Metropolitana de Guadalajara) ====
The Guadalajara conurbation in the state of Jalisco (colloquially known as the City of Guadalajara, as that is the state capital and most populous of the cities) consists of seven municipalities: Guadalajara, Zapopan, Tlaquepaque, Tonalá, El Salto, Zapotlanejo, and Tlajomulco de Zúñiga. Officially two other cities (Juanacatlán and Ixtlahuacán de los Membrillos) are also considered part of the Metropolitan Area, although they are not contiguous with the other seven. The area had an estimated population of 4 500 000 in 2010, spread over a combined area of 2,734 square kilometres (1,056 mi^{2}).

=== United States ===
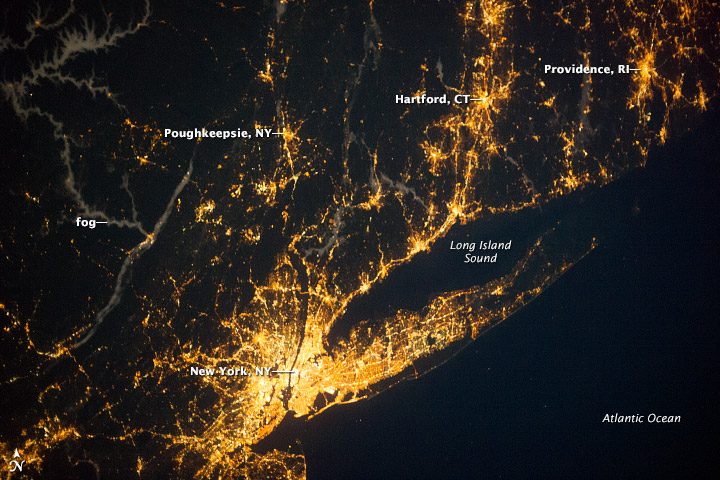
Nocturnal view of the New York metropolitan area, the world's most brightly illuminated conurbation and largest urban landmass. Long Island extends 120 miles eastward from Manhattan, the central core of the conurbation.

==== Puerto Rico ====
The Caribbean area has a conurbation in Puerto Rico consisting of San Juan, Bayamón, Guaynabo, Carolina, Canóvanas, Trujillo Alto, Toa Alta, Toa Baja, Cataño, and Caguas. The area is colloquially known as the "Área Metropolitana", and houses around 1.4 million inhabitants spread over an area of approximately 396.61 square kilometers (153.13 sq mi), making it the largest city in the Caribbean by area.

==== New York Tri-state area ====
One example of a conurbation is the expansive concept of the New York metropolitan area (the Tri-state region) centered on New York City, including 30 counties spread among New York State, New Jersey, Connecticut, and Pennsylvania, with an estimated population of 21,961,994 in 2007. Approximately one-fifteenth of all U.S. residents live in the Greater New York City area, the world's most brightly illuminated urban conurbation and largest urban landmass. This conurbation is the result of several central cities whose urban areas have merged.

==== San Francisco Bay Area ====
Another conurbation is the combination of the metropolitan areas of San Francisco, Oakland, San Jose, and several minor urban centers with a combined population of nearly 8 million people, known as the San Francisco Bay Area.

==== Greater Los Angeles Area ====
The Greater Los Angeles Area consists of the merging of several distinct central cities and counties including Los Angeles, Orange County, Riverside, San Bernardino, and Ventura. The area is also often referred to simply as southern California or colloquially as SoCal (a larger region which includes San Diego). In 2016, Southern California had a population of 23,800,500, making it slightly larger than the New York Tri-State Area, and is projected to remain so due to a faster growth rate. But because southern California is not yet a recognized Combined Statistical Area by the United States Office of Management and Budget, the New York Tri-State Area officially remains the nation's largest as of now.

==== San Diego–Tijuana ====
The largest conurbation between the United States and Mexico is San Diego–Tijuana. It includes the two countries' busiest border crossing and a shared economy.

==== Dallas–Fort Worth ====
Three large cities—Dallas, Fort Worth, and Arlington—make up this area. Each city is linked by bordering city limits or suburbs. The area is also known as the Dallas–Fort Worth "metroplex", so called because it has more than one principal anchor city of nearly equal size or importance, and is included in the emerging megalopolis known as the Texas Triangle. According to Texas Monthly, the term is a portmanteau of the terms "metropolitan" and "complex" and was created by local advertising agency TracyLocke. The North Texas Commission trademarked the term "Dallas/Fort Worth Metroplex" in 1972 as a replacement for the previously ubiquitous term "North Texas". Urban areas with smaller secondary anchor cities (including Mexico City, New York City, Los Angeles, Houston, Chicago, and Phoenix) are not considered to be conurbations.

==== Detroit–Windsor ====
The major U.S. city of Detroit lies immediately across the Detroit River from Windsor, Ontario in Canada. In many respects—economically, historically, culturally, socially, and geographically—Windsor is more a part of Metro Detroit than of Ontario. The two cities and their surrounding suburbs are commonly referred to collectively as the Detroit–Windsor area. The Detroit-Windsor border is the largest commercial border crossing in North America and the busiest between the two countries.

==== South Florida ====
The entire tri-county area also known as the Miami-Fort Lauderdale-West Palm Beach metropolitan area is now continuously urbanized along a roughly 100 miles (161 km) length of the Florida east coast as well as extending inland and continuing south of Miami as far as Florida City. Although this is generally all referred to as a single metropolitan area, not a conurbation, it is sometimes broken up into the Miami, Fort Lauderdale, and West Palm Beach metros.

==== Minneapolis–St. Paul ====
Minneapolis–Saint Paul is the most populous urban area in the state of Minnesota, and is composed of 182 cities and townships built around the Mississippi, Minnesota, and St. Croix rivers. The area is also nicknamed the Twin Cities for its two largest cities, Minneapolis, with the highest population and Saint Paul, the state capital.

==== Quad Cities ====
The Quad Cities is a metropolitan area located along the border of Illinois and Iowa. Straddling the Mississippi River as it flows west, the area once known as the "Tri Cities" consists of a handful of larger cities and smaller municipalities that have grown together. The largest cities include Rock Island, Moline, and East Moline in Illinois as well as Davenport and Bettendorf in Iowa.

==== Northwest Arkansas ====
Northwest Arkansas is a metropolitan area in the Ozarks containing four of the ten largest cities in Arkansas - Fayetteville, Springdale, Rogers, and Bentonville. These four cities and smaller municipalities between and around them have grown together over time to form a conurbation with no dominant city.

==== Research Triangle ====
Raleigh is the capital city of North Carolina and second largest by population. Nearby cities Durham and Chapel Hill form a triangle shape along with Raleigh. These cities each contain major research universities that, along with the Research Triangle Park, bind these cities together to form one continuous urban area.

== Oceania ==
=== Australia ===
==== Albury-Wodonga ====
Albury and Wodonga are cross border cities which are geographically separated by the Murray River. Albury on the north of the river is part of New South Wales, while Wodonga on the south bank is in Victoria. In the early 1970s Albury-Wodonga was selected as the primary focus of the Whitlam government's scheme to arrest the uncontrolled growth of Australia's large metropolitan areas (in particular Sydney and Melbourne) by encouraging decentralisation. The two cities combine to form an urban area with an estimated population of 93,603.

==== Canberra-Queanbeyan ====
A cross border built-up area comprising the nation's capital Canberra in the Australian Capital Territory and the city of Queanbeyan in New South Wales, which is considered by the Australian Bureau of Statistics to have a single labour market.

==== Newcastle, Sydney, and Wollongong ====
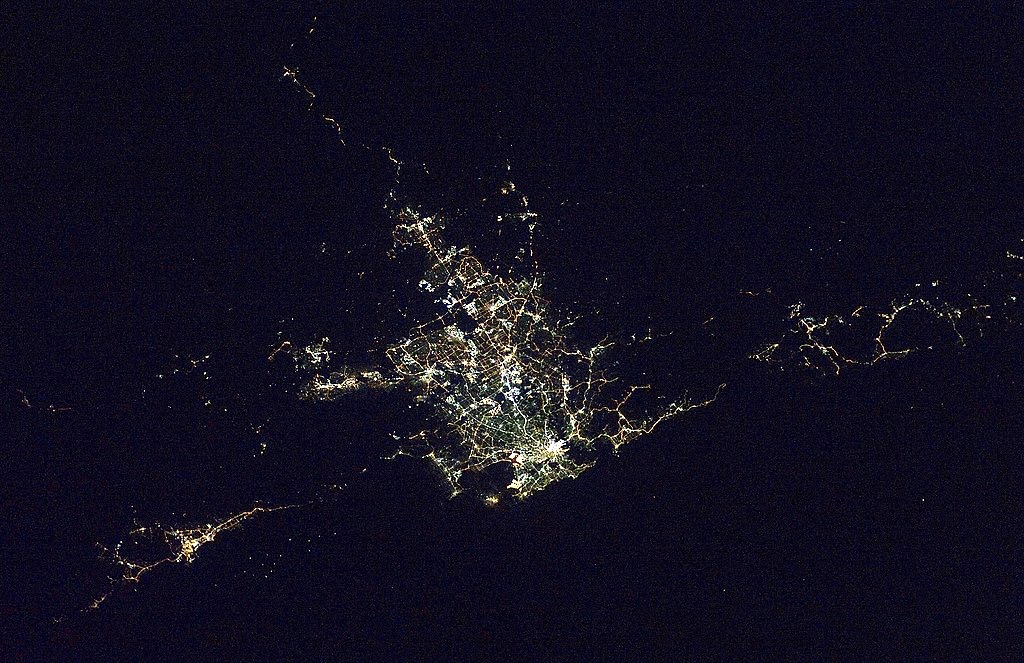
Satellite photo from 2012 showing Sydney in the center with Wollongong on the left and the Central Coast on the right

This conurbation in New South Wales extends from Newcastle and surrounding satellite towns of the Hunter Valley through the Central Coast. It is broken up only by waterways and national parks, through to the greater Sydney metropolitan area and the Wollongong urban area. The total length from the top to the bottom of the conurbation is around 270 km with a population of just over 6 million people.

Transport is linked throughout the region by motorways, the M1, M2, M4, M5, M7, M8, M15 and M31. An extensive public transport network allows for commuting for work or services across and between multiple distinct but joined centres, with NSW TrainLink's intercity network serving Sydney, the Central Coast, Newcastle, the Hunter Valley and the Illawarra.

Plans for making Wollongong, Sydney and Newcastle a single city have been around since the 1960s. A report titled The Committee for Sydney contains a chapter called The Sandstone Mega-Region, Uniting Newcastle, the Central Coast, Sydney, Wollongong (since all of the cities are in a geological region called the Sydney Basin, which is made up of Sydney sandstone). The report says that the link would benefit the "six cities" within the region, which are: Illawarra and Wollongong, the Western City (Greater Western Sydney), the Central City (Parramatta), the Eastern City (Sydney central business district, eastern suburbs, and Northern Sydney), the Central Coast (Gosford) and Newcastle (including Lake Macquarie).

==== Greater Perth ====
The Perth Metropolitan Region, and Peel regions form a continuous urban area in Western Australia more than 130 km (80 miles) long, on a north–south axis. It is sometimes known as Greater Perth and has a population of more than 2.3 million (2023). Introduction of the Mandurah railway line in 2007 made it possible for commuters to travel the 70 km (43.5 mi) from Mandurah to Perth in 51 minutes.

==== South East Queensland ====
A built-up area 200 kilometres long which is centred on Brisbane, includes the local government areas (LGAs) of Gold Coast, Ipswich, Logan City, Moreton Bay, Redland City, Sunshine Coast, Noosa Shire, and Tweed Heads, New South Wales. This area is served by a single public transport network, Translink.

Broader definitions of South East Queensland are also used, including the separate built-up area of Toowoomba (140 kilometres; 87 miles west of Brisbane), which is not part of the Translink network. Expansive definitions of South East Queensland give it a population of more than 3.4 million people (2014), covers 22,420 square kilometres (8,660 sq mi), incorporates ten LGAs, and extends 240 kilometres (150 mi) from Noosa in the north to the Gold Coast (some sources include Tweed Heads).

==== Greater Darwin ====
The Greater Darwin metropolitan area is a built-up urban area in the Northern Territory that spans across two cities: Darwin (the capital of the Northern Territory) and Palmerston (Darwin's satellite city). It lies within three local government areas: the City of Darwin, Litchfield Municipality and the City of Palmerston.

=== New Zealand ===
In 2010 Auckland became a unitary authority encompassing seven former city and district councils including Auckland City, Manukau City, North Shore City and Waitakere City as well as a number of smaller towns, rural area and the islands of the Hauraki Gulf. Auckland Council is the largest council in Australasia and the region has a population of 1,529,300, being almost 33% of the total population of New Zealand. The entire urban area rather than the constituent administrative city was often referred to as "Auckland" by New Zealanders long before formal recognition.

The Wellington Metropolitan Area compromises the four cities of Wellington City, Porirua and the cities of Lower Hutt and Upper Hutt, together known as Hutt Valley. The Wellington Metropolitan Area is the second largest urban population in New Zealand with a population of 440,900 as of the 2023 census (or 550,500 if the Wairarapa region is included), followed by Christchurch City at 396,200.

== South America ==
Article in Spanish Wikipedia: List of Conurbations in South America

=== Argentina ===
Conurbation	Population	Year	Note
Greater Buenos Aires	13,641,973	2010	Metro region excluding La Plata and its metro area (an additional 694,253 [ INDEC ]).

- Greater Buenos Aires (12.046.799) – Greater La Plata (694.253) – Zárate / Campana

=== Brazil ===
The entire Rio–São Paulo area is also sometimes considered a conurbation, and plans are in the works to connect the cities with a high-speed rail. However the government of Brazil does not consider this area a single unit for statistical purposes, and population data may not be reliable.

Conurbation	Population	Year	Note
CME São Paulo	27,640,577	2009	The CME of São Paulo is federally defined as the São Paulo Metro region (RMSP) and its conurbations.
RM Rio de Janeiro	12,330,186	2016	Metropolitan region.
RM Belo Horizonte	5,916,189	2018	Usually referred to as the Greater Belo Horizonte, comprising 34 municipalities and some 16 other surrounding cities.

=== Colombia ===
Conurbation	Population	Year	Note
Metropolitan Area of Bogotá	10,733,206	2014	Conurbation only between Bogota and Soacha
Metropolitan Area of the Aburrá Valley	3,821,797	2014	Metro region

=== Peru ===
Lima Metropolitan Area	9,500,000	2017	Lima is expected to become a megacity before the end of the decade, and this conurbation is estimated to have grown by over one million people between 2007 and 2017.

== See also ==
- Ecumenopolis
- Ekistics
- Transborder agglomeration
- Urban sprawl
