= Región Centro, Jalisco =

Centro Region
- Region
- #12-Centro Region
- Country: Mexico
- State: Jalisco
- Largest city: Guadalajara

Area
  - Total: 5,275 km^{2} (2,037 sq mi)

Population (2020)
  - Total: 5,284,601
- Time zone: UTC−06:00 (Zona Centro)

The Centro region is one of the regions of the Mexican state of Jalisco.. It has a population of 5,284,601 people as of 2020, making up nearly 65% of Jalisco's total population.

== Municipalities ==
| Municipality code | Name | Population | | Land Area | | | Population density | |
| Municipality code | Name | 2020 | Rank | km^{2} | sq mi | Rank | 2020 | Rank |
|---|---|---|---|---|---|---|---|---|
| 029 | Cuquío | 17,820 | 11 | 653 | 252 | 5 | 27/km^{2} (71/sq mi) | 10 |
| 070 | El Salto | 232,852 | 6 | 92 | 36 | 12 | 2,531/km^{2} (6,555/sq mi) | 4 |
| 039 | Guadalajara | 1,385,629 | 2 | 150 | 58 | 9 | 9,238/km^{2} (23,925/sq mi) | 1 |
| 044 | Ixtlahuacán de los Membrillos | 67,969 | 7 | 184 | 71 | 7 | 369/km^{2} (957/sq mi) | 7 |
| 045 | Ixtlahuacán del Río | 20,465 | 10 | 850 | 330 | 2 | 24/km^{2} (62/sq mi) | 11 |
| 051 | Juanacatlán | 30,855 | 9 | 141 | 54 | 10 | 219/km^{2} (567/sq mi) | 8 |
| 071 | San Cristóbal de la Barranca | 2,924 | 12 | 509 | 197 | 6 | 6/km^{2} (15/sq mi) | 12 |
| 098 | San Pedro Tlaquepaque | 687,127 | 4 | 119 | 46 | 11 | 5,774/km^{2} (14,955/sq mi) | 2 |
| 097 | Tlajomulco de Zúñiga | 727,750 | 3 | 682 | 263 | 4 | 1,067/km^{2} (2,764/sq mi) | 6 |
| 101 | Tonalá | 569,913 | 5 | 156 | 60 | 8 | 3,653/km^{2} (9,462/sq mi) | 3 |
| 120 | Zapopan | 1,476,491 | 1 | 1,017 | 393 | 1 | 1,452/km^{2} (3,760/sq mi) | 5 |
| 124 | Zapotlanejo | 64,806 | 8 | 722 | 279 | 3 | 90/km^{2} (232/sq mi) | 9 |
| | Centro Region | 5,284,601 | — | 5,275 | 2,036.69 | — | 1,002/km^{2} (2,595/sq mi) | — |
Source: INEGI

=== Largest cities ===
Largest cities or towns in Centro Region Source:
| Rank | | Municipality | Pop. |
|---|---|---|---|
| 1 | Guadalajara | Guadalajara | 1,385,629 |
| 2 | Zapopan | Zapopan | 1,257,547 |
| 3 | Tlaquepaque | San Pedro Tlaquepaque | 650,123 |
| 4 | Tonalá | Tonalá | 442,440 |
| 5 | Hacienda Santa Fe | Tlajomulco de Zúñiga | 139,174 |
| 6 | Tesistán | Zapopan | 91,631 |
| 7 | Coyula | Tonalá | 64,886 |
| 8 | San Agustín | Tlajomulco de Zúñiga | 49,402 |
| 9 | Tlajomulco de Zúñiga | Tlajomulco de Zúñiga | 44,103 |
| 10 | Las Pintas | El Salto | 42,576 |
