= Nueva Plaza Cartel =

Mexican criminal organization that operates in the state of Jalisco

- Cártel Nueva Plaza
- Founded: 2018
- Founded by: Érick Valencia Salazar, Emilio Alejandro Pulido Saldaña and Carlos Enrique Sánchez Martínez
- Founding location: El Salto, Jalisco, Mexico
- Years active: 2018−present
- Territory: Colima and Jalisco
- Ethnicity: Mexican
- Criminal activities: Drug trafficking, money laundering, extortion, robbery, murder, arms trafficking
- Allies: Sinaloa Cartel
- Rivals: Mexico; Jalisco New Generation Cartel; United States

The Nueva Plaza Cartel (Spanish: Cártel Nueva Plaza) is a Mexican criminal organization from the state of Jalisco. The group began as a splinter group of the Jalisco New Generation Cartel, having an important presence in the Guadalajara metropolitan area. The cartel was previously commanded by Carlos Enrique Sánchez Martínez (“El Cholo"), Emilio Alejandro Pulido Saldaña ("El Tiburón"), and Érick Valencia Salazar ("El 85").

Nueva Plaza is considered a minor player in the Mexican Drug War, as it reportedly lacks international drug trafficking capacities and focuses on domestic drug dealing. As of 2026, the leadership of the cartel is disputed, following the arrests and deaths of all three of its founding members.

== History ==
=== Internal struggle in the CJNG and cartel formation ===
In March 2017, Carlos Enrique Sánchez Martínez (“El Cholo”), a higher-up in the CJNG, ordered the murder of an unidentified CJNG member known as "El Colombiano", an important financial operator of the criminal organization in Puerto Vallarta. After being informed of this plan, CJNG leader El Mencho attempted to retaliate by sending a hit squad to assassinate Sánchez Martínez; however, members of the cartel loyal to Sánchez Martínez would kill the leader of the hit squad, “El Kartón/El Marro”, in August of that same year before the hit occurred.

At some point between Sánchez Martínez’ order to assassinate "El Colombiano" and the killing of “El Kartón/El Marro”, the Nueva Plaza Cartel was formed. The group was initially commanded by Sánchez Martínez and Érick Valencia Salazar ("El 85"), a former Milenio Cartel and CJNG leader which had supposedly been betrayed. CJNG co-founder Emilio Alejandro Pulido Saldaña ("El Tiburón") would eventually join the Nueva Plaza Cartel as well, and was one of the cartel's first bosses.

The group was initially composed on many low-level CJNG members, and involved in the murder of civilians and rival criminals, many of whom ended up being buried in clandestine graves, notably in the municipalities of Tlajomulco de Zúñiga and Zapopan. The group was also known to have infiltrated and bribed local police forces, in addition to having backing from the Sinaloa Cartel.

It is reported that the group was in control of Tlaquepaque, El Salto, Tlajomulco de Zuñiga, Tonalá, and western Guadalajara, while disputing the municipality of Zapopan; these cities in the Guadalajara Metropolitan Area composed the main centers of operations of both the CJNG and Nueva Plaza. Sánchez Martínez mentioned an alleged union with Secretary of Security and Citizen Protection Omar García Harfuch to fight against the CJNG in a publicly released video, in addition to claiming responsibility of the February 2021 Tonalá massacre, where 11 tile and steel workers were killed in a drive-by shooting outside a residential building.

=== Deaths and capture of founding members ===
On 18 March 2021, members of the CJNG captured Sánchez Martínez and recorded videos of him claiming responsibility for the wave of violence that occurred in Jalisco in the previous weeks; he was subsequently killed. The body of El Cholo was found the next day, abandoned in a public square in the municipality of Tlaquepaque, along with a drug message embedded in his torso with a knife. The abandonment of the body in a public square was seen by people in media as a representation of the violence that had preceded his death.

According to the autopsy carried out by forensics, it was revealed that Sánchez Martínez had been tortured and had most likely been killed by three gunshots to the head; seven of his toes were broken and one was cut off, both legs were broken at the level of the tibia, kneecap, and femur, as well as marks by electric tweezers and several other injuries around his body such as knife lacerations and broken ribs. Forensic evidence indicated his eyes and tongue were extracted while he was still alive. After the death of Sánchez Martínez, it became known that the successor was Erick Valencia Salazar (El 85), who handled the cartel with a lower profile.

Some time after Sánchez Martínez death the same month, Pulido Saldaña (“El Tiburón”), who was now the Nueva Plaza Cartel's second-in-command, surrendered to Jalisco state authorities.

On 4 September 2022, Valencia Salazar (“El 85”) and two of his associates were arrested by Mexican Army and National Guard forces in Tapalpa, Jalisco. On 27 February 2025, Valencia Salazar was among 29 suspected Mexican drug lords who were extradited to the United States. On 7 April 2026, Valencia Salazar pled guilty in a U.S. federal court in Washington D.C. to one count of federal drug trafficking conspiracy.

== See also ==
- List of Mexican cartels
