= 20th federal electoral district of Jalisco =

Federal electoral district of Mexico

Jalisco's 20th
- Electoral district of the Chamber of Deputies of Mexico

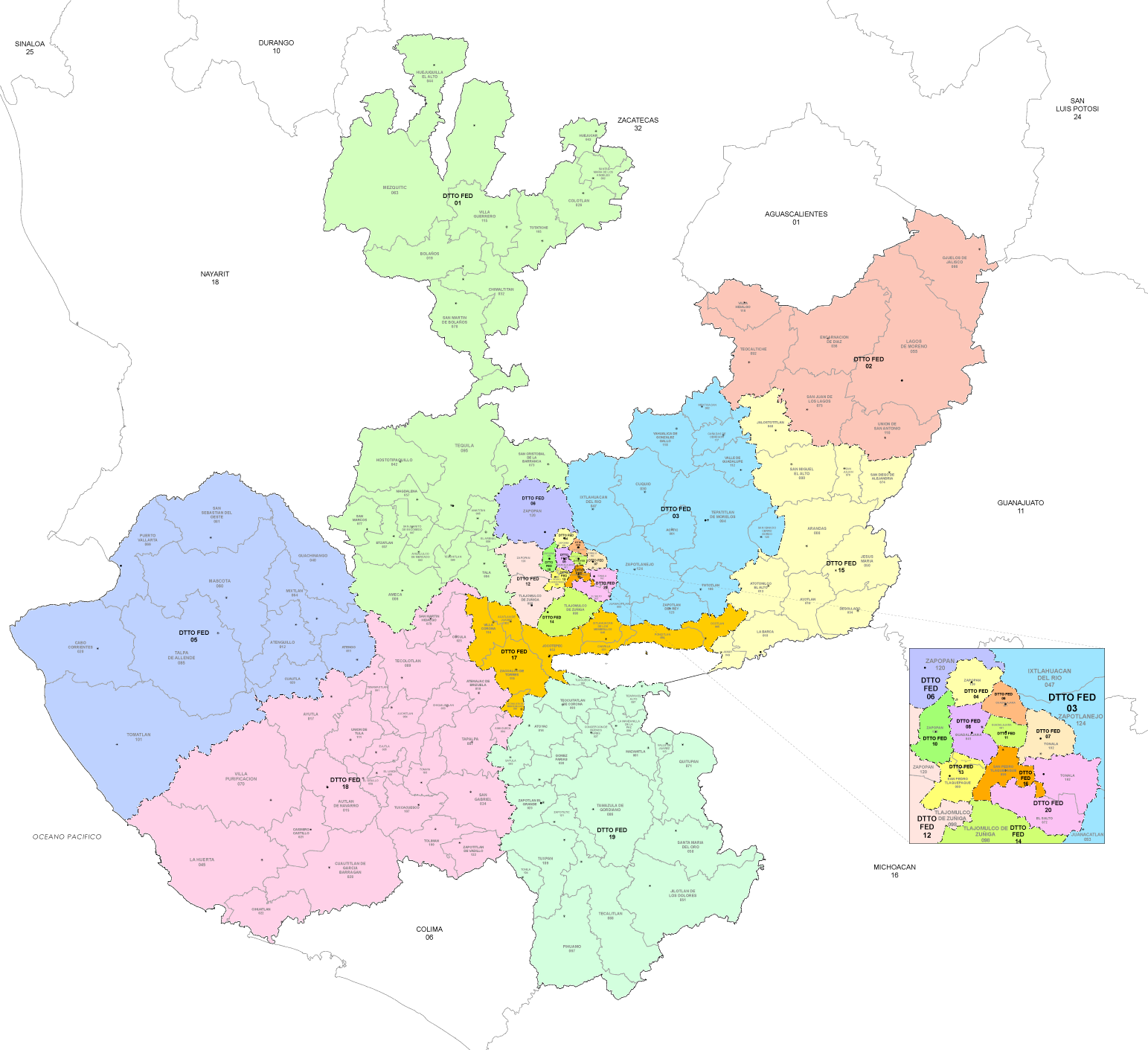
- 20th district

Incumbent
- Member: Katia Castillo Lozano
- Party: ▌Morena
- Congress: 66th (2024–2027)

District
- State: Jalisco
- Head town: Tonalá
- Coordinates: 20°37′N 103°14′W
- Covers: Municipalities of Tonalá (part) and El Salto
- PR region: First
- Precincts: 52
- Population: 400,804 (2020 census)

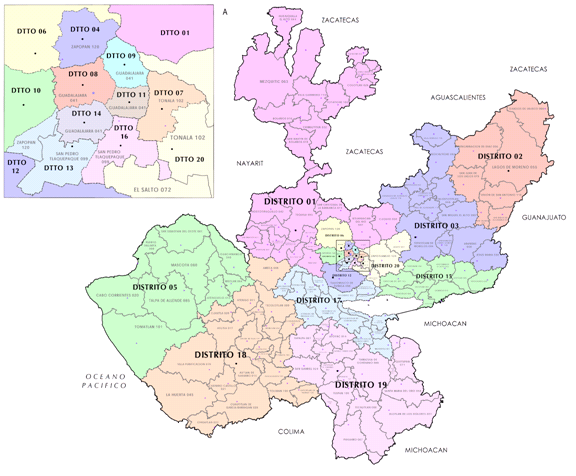
Jalisco's districts in 2017–2022

The 20th federal electoral district of Jalisco (Spanish: Distrito electoral federal 20 de Jalisco) is one of the 300 electoral districts into which Mexico is divided for elections to the federal Chamber of Deputies and one of 20 such districts in the state of Jalisco.

It elects one deputy to the lower house of Congress for each three-year legislative session by means of the first-past-the-post system. Votes cast in the district also count towards the calculation of proportional representation ("plurinominal") deputies elected from the first region.

Suspended in 1930, (Note: An amendment to Article 52 of the Constitution in 1928 changed the original provision of "one deputy per 60,000 inhabitants" to "one deputy per 100,000"; as a result, the size of the Chamber of Deputies fell from 281 in the 1928 election to 171 in 1934.) the 20th district was re-established as part of the 1977 electoral reforms. It was suspended again in 1996 but restored by the National Electoral Institute (INE) in its 2017 redistricting.

The current member for the district, elected in the 2024 general election, is Katia Alejandra Castillo Lozano of the National Regeneration Movement (Morena).

== District territory ==
Under the National Electoral Institute's 2023 districting plan, which is to be used for the 2024, 2027 and 2030 federal elections, Jalisco's 20th district is located in the Guadalajara Metropolitan Area and comprises 52 electoral precincts (secciones electorales) across two of the state's 125 municipalities:

- A portion of Tonalá (26 precincts) and the whole of El Salto (26 precincts). (Note: The bulk of Tonalá (69 precincts) is assigned to the 7th district.)

The head town (cabecera distrital), where results from individual polling stations are gathered together and tallied, is the city of Tonalá. The district reported a population of 400,804 in the 2020 census.

== Previous districting schemes ==
Evolution of electoral district numbers
	1974	1978	1996	2005	2017	2023
Jalisco	13	20	19	19	20	20
Chamber of Deputies	196	300				

2017–2022

The 20th district was restored in the 2017 redistricting process. Its head town was at Tonalá and it covered 90 precincts across five municipalities in the centre of the state:
- Acatic, Juanacatlán, El Salto, Tonalá (part) and Zapotlanejo.

1996–2017

Between 1996 and 2017, Jalisco had only 19 congressional seats.

1978–1996

The districting scheme in force from 1978 to 1996 was the result of the 1977 electoral reforms, which increased the number of single-member seats in the Chamber of Deputies from 196 to 300. Under that plan, Jalisco's seat allocation rose from 13 to 20. The 20th district's head town was at Zapopan and it covered a part of the city, a part of its surrounding municipality, and the whole of the neighbouring municipality of Tala.

== Deputies returned to Congress ==
(Mexico) National parties
- Current
- PAN
- PRI
- PT
- PVEM
- MC
- Morena
- PAZ
- Somos
- Defunct or local only
- PLM
- PNR
- PRM
- PNM
- PP
- PPS
- PARM
- PFCRN
- CON
- PANAL
- PSD
- PES
- PES
- PRD

Jalisco's 20th district
Election	Deputy	Party	Term	Legislature
1916	Rafael Ochoa		1916–1917	Constituent Congress of Querétaro
1917	Ramón Blancarte		1917–1918	27th Congress
1918	Ramón Blancarte		1918–1920	28th Congress
1920	Natalio Espinosa		1920–1922	29th Congress
1922	Francisco González Guerrero		1922–1924	30th Congress
1924	Justo González		1924–1926	31st Congress
1926	Severiano Lozano		1926–1928	32nd Congress
1928	Francisco Labastida Izquierdo		1928–1930	33rd Congress
The 20th district was suspended between 1930 and 1979
1979	Antonio Ruiz Rosas	Institutional Revolutionary Party	1979–1982	51st Congress
1982	Rafael García Sancho Gómez	Institutional Revolutionary Party	1982–1985	52nd Congress
1985	Constancio Hernández Allende	Institutional Revolutionary Party	1985–1988	53rd Congress
1988	Raúl Octavio Espinoza Martínez	National Action Party (Mexico)	1988–1991	54th Congress
1991	Jesús Enrique Ramos Flores	Institutional Revolutionary Party	1991–1994	55th Congress
1994	Francisco Ledezma Durán	Institutional Revolutionary Party	1994–1997	56th Congress
The 20th district was suspended between 1997 and 2018
2018	Ana Priscila González García	Citizens' Movement (Mexico)	2018–2021	64th Congress
2021	María del Refugio Camarena Jáuregui	Institutional Revolutionary Party	2021–2024	65th Congress
2024	Katia Alejandra Castillo Lozano	National Regeneration Movement	2024–2027	66th Congress

== Presidential elections ==
Jalisco's 20th district
Election	District won by	Party or coalition	%
2018	Andrés Manuel López Obrador	Juntos Haremos Historia	43.9059
2024	Claudia Sheinbaum Pardo	Sigamos Haciendo Historia	54.6822
