= San José del Castillo =

- Town
- Location within Mexico Location within Jalisco
- Coordinates: 20.51346°N 103.23813°W
- Country: Mexico
- State: Jalisco
- Municipality: El Salto

Area
  - Total: 5.08 km^{2} (1.96 sq mi)

Population (2020 census)
  - Total: 39,246
  - Density: 7,730/km^{2} (20,000/sq mi)

San José del Castillo is a Pueblo (town), with a population of 39,246 (2020 census), in Jalisco, Mexico near the city of Guadalajara. It is known for its festivals on March 11 to 19 celebrating our lord San Jose……
