= Coyula, Tonalá =

Locality in Jalisco, Mexico

Coyula
- Locality

- Location within Jalisco Location within Mexico
- Coordinates: 20°39′31″N 103°13′35″W
- Country: Mexico
- State: Jalisco
- Municipality: Tonalá

Area
  - Total: 9.02 km^{2} (3.48 sq mi)
- Elevation: 1,532 m (5,026 ft)

Population (2020)
  - Total: 64,886
  - Density: 7,190/km^{2} (18,600/sq mi)
- Time zone: UTC-6 (CZ)
- Postal code: 45410

Coyula is a locality in Tonalá, Jalisco, Mexico. It is part of the Guadalajara Metropolitan Area. As of 2020, it has a total population of 64,886.

== Geography ==
Coyula is located on the northern portion of Tonalá, to the north of Cerro de La Reina. It is located at an average elevation of 1,532 meters above the sea level.

== Climate ==
Coyula has a Humid Subtropical Climate (Cwa). It sees the most rainfall on July, with an average precipitation of 165.9 mm; and the least amount of rainfall on April, with an average precipitation of 1.6 mm.

Climate data for Coyula
Month	Jan	Feb	Mar	Apr	May	Jun	Jul	Aug	Sep	Oct	Nov	Dec	Year
Mean daily maximum °C (°F)	24 (75)	26 (79)	28 (82)	31 (88)	32 (90)	29 (84)	27 (81)	26 (79)	26 (79)	26 (79)	26 (79)	25 (77)	27 (81)
Daily mean °C (°F)	14 (57)	16 (61)	19 (66)	22 (72)	23 (73)	23 (73)	21 (70)	21 (70)	20 (68)	19 (66)	16 (61)	15 (59)	19 (66)
Mean daily minimum °C (°F)	6 (43)	7 (45)	9 (48)	11 (52)	14 (57)	17 (63)	16 (61)	16 (61)	16 (61)	13 (55)	8 (46)	6 (43)	12 (53)
Average rainfall mm (inches)	15.7 (0.62)	11.8 (0.46)	4.3 (0.17)	1.6 (0.06)	17.4 (0.69)	116.8 (4.60)	165.9 (6.53)	139.6 (5.50)	106.9 (4.21)	35.8 (1.41)	10.3 (0.41)	5.6 (0.22)	631.7 (24.88)
Average rainy days (≥ 1 mm)	1.8	1.6	0.7	0.5	3.5	16.6	23.5	22.6	16.3	5.9	1.6	1.0	95.6
Mean daily daylight hours	11.0	11.5	12.1	12.6	13.1	13.4	13.2	12.8	12.2	11.6	11.1	10.9	12.1
Source: Weatherspark.com

== Demographics ==
According to the census carried out in 2020 by the National Institute of Statistics and Geography (INEGI), there are a total of 64,886 inhabitants within Coyula, of which 32,783 are female and 32,103 are male. There are 22,967 houses, of which 18,422 are inhabited.

Historical population
Year	Pop.	±%
1900	409	—
1910	359	−12.2%
1921	345	−3.9%
1930	382	+10.7%
1940	397	+3.9%
1950	521	+31.2%
1960	659	+26.5%
1970	998	+51.4%
1980	1,526	+52.9%
1990	1,857	+21.7%
2000	5,139	+176.7%
2010	29,674	+477.4%
2020	64,886	+118.7%
