= Puerta de Hierro, Zapopan =

Neighbourhood of Zapopan, Mexico

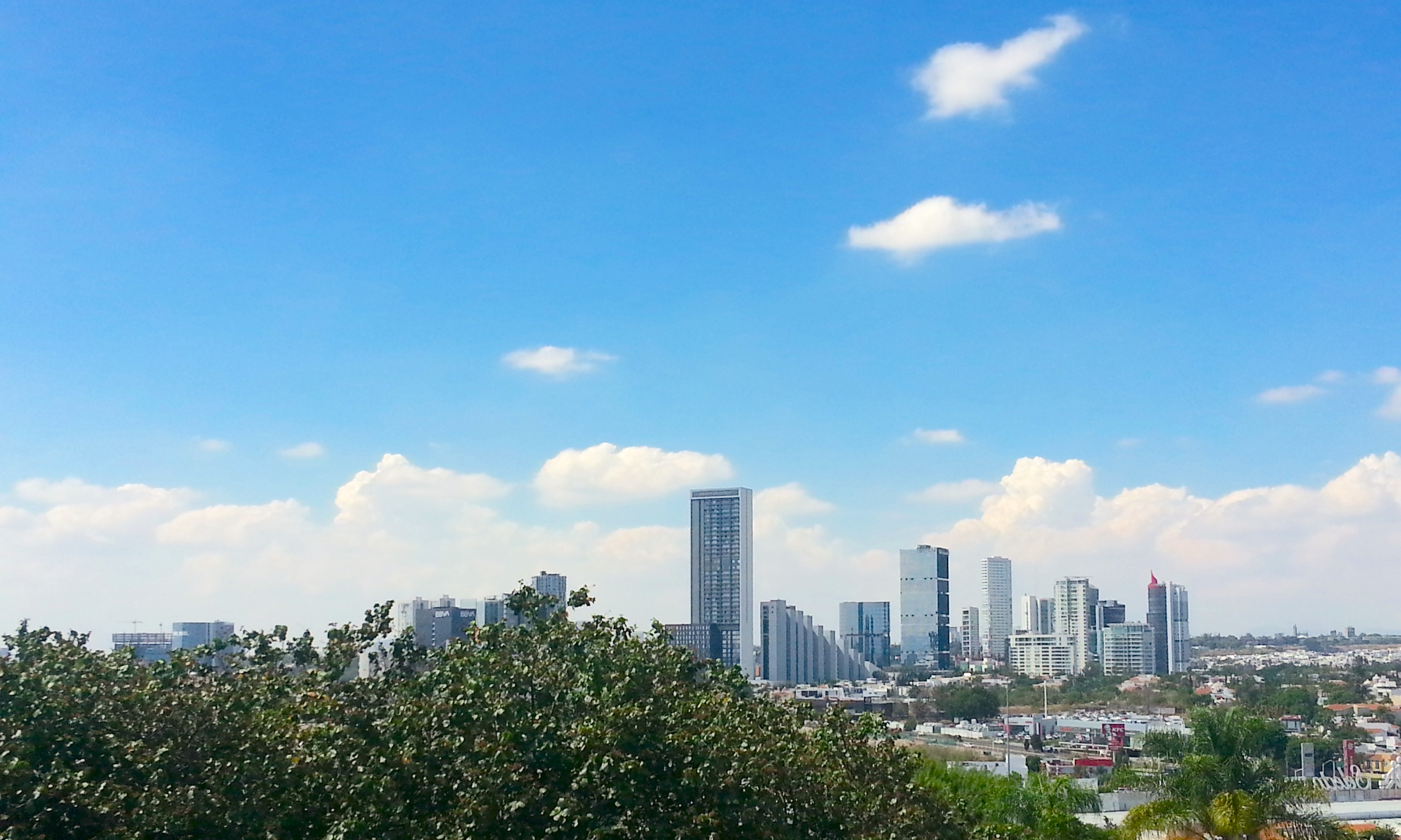
Puerta de Hierro, Zapopan, Guadalajara Metro Area.

Puerta de Hierro (Spanish pronunciation: [ˈpweɾta ðe ˈʝerro]; "Iron Gate") is a neighborhood in Zapopan, Jalisco, as part of the metropolitan area of Guadalajara. It was developed through a joint venture by the Leaño family, owners of the Universidad Autónoma de Guadalajara, and the Gómez Flores family, owners of GIG, Minsa, Grupo Geo, and Dina.

The neighborhood is located on Avenida Patria, in the west-central part of Zapopan, in the northwest part of the Guadalajara metropolitan area. It is about 500 acres, and includes a residential area, shopping mall, and a business district. It is notorious for its affluent population and high-rise developments in the business district, including the second-tallest building in the metro area, the Aura Altitude, surpassed by the RIU Plaza Hotel in south Guadalajara. It is also home to the Centro Médico Puerta de Hierro, built using private funds, and a US$14.5 million loan from the International Finance Corporation, the private-sector lending arm of the World Bank.

The Andares Shopping Mall is a high-end shopping mall located in the south eastern edge of the neighborhood. Andares is an exclusive shopping centers in Mexico: a US$530 million complex, featuring some of the best known brands in the world, such as Louis Vuitton, Burberry, Dolce & Gabbana, Dior, Salvatore Ferragamo, Swarovski, and Lacoste. As part of the complex and the surrounding area, the Andares zone includes a Hyatt Hotel-condo (construction starting in 2015), luxury residencies designed by Mexican architect Juan Sordo Madaleno, as well as Ferrari, Maserati, BMW, Mercedes, Audi, Volvo and Lincoln dealerships. The zone is also home to the new offices of Oracle and U-Fit, one of the most exclusive gyms in Latin America.

Since the opening of Andares in December 2008, and based on those investments as well as other developments, the property value has been increasing to prices never seen before in the Guadalajara Metropolitan Area a continuous trend expected to grow even more. The price of land averages over US$1,000 per square meter, and the apartments range in prices from US$300,000 to US$2,000,000.

== See also ==
- Zapopan
- Guadalajara
