= Pueblo (disambiguation) =

Pueblo is a Spanish-language term referring to a town or other small settlement, or to the population of a country.

Pueblo may also refer to:

- Pueblo peoples, a Native American people/tribe in the Southwestern U.S.
- Pueblo Revival architecture, a revival of the original style
- Pueblo, Colorado, a U.S. city
- Pueblo West, Colorado a separate independent unincorporated community west of Pueblo, Colorado
- Pueblo Peak, a mountain in New Mexico
- Pueblo Supermarkets, Puerto Rican supermarket chain
- USS Pueblo (AGER-2), a United States warship and namesake of the "Pueblo Incident" in 1968
- Pueblo (film), a 1973 American television drama film that aired on ABC
- "Pueblo" (game), a board game
- Spanish colonial pueblos in North America
- Pueblo, Corozal, Puerto Rico, a barrio
- Pueblo, Lares, Puerto Rico, a barrio
- Pueblo, Moca, Puerto Rico, a barrio
- Pueblo, Rincón, Puerto Rico, a barrio
- Pueblo, San Juan, Puerto Rico, a barrio
