= Juanacatlán =

Juanacatlán Xonacatlan
- Municipality

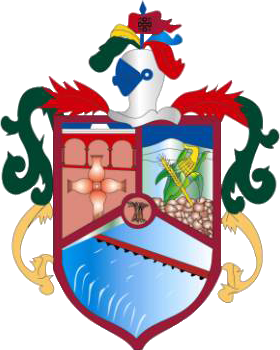
- Coat of arms

- Location within Mexico
- Coordinates: 20°30′N 103°10′W
- Country: Mexico
- State: Jalisco

Government
  - Municipal president: Francisco de la Cerda Suárez; PAN

Area
  - Total: 138.1 km^{2} (53.3 sq mi)
  - Town: 3.01 km^{2} (1.16 sq mi)

Population (2020 census)
  - Total: 30,855
  - Density: 223.4/km^{2} (578.7/sq mi)
  - Town: 9,626
  - Town density: 3,200/km^{2} (8,280/sq mi)
- Time zone: UTC-6 (Central Standard Time)

Juanacatlán (Spanish pronunciation: [xwanakaˈtlan]) is a town and municipio (municipality) in the central region of the Mexican state of Jalisco.

== Origin of name ==
Juanacatlán gets its name from the Nahuatl word "Xonacatlan", which means place abundant in onions or onion place (from "Xonaca" for onions and "Tlan" for place).

The hieroglyph of Juanacatlán includes the symbol of the Tlaxcala, representing the battles and the places where the Tlaxcaltecans went with the Nuño de Guzmán expedition, after the conquest of Mexico.

== Seal ==
The seal of Juanacatlán is based on the region's economic activities and history, and is divided into four parts:

- In the center: Nahuatl ideogram of Tlaxcala, which signifies "Xonacatlan" in the indigenous vocabulary, from which is derived the name of the population.
- Upper left: This section includes symbols of the principal economic activity of the region, agriculture, and presents the basic products produced: wheat and corn, against a base of stone, and the image of Papantón hill, a monumental figure from the countryside that dominates the municipio.
- Upper right: at the base are the arches of the first public building of the area, that of the Municipal President, and in front, the Cross of Cantera, monument upon whose rectangular faces are inscribed the date of the foundation of the region's population.
- Lower part: As a memory of the past, the celebrated waterfall of El Salto de Juanacatlán, today almost gone, but once a monument that gave the region national recognition.

The leaves that surround the seal are identical to those in the seal of Jalisco, whose people Juanacatlán joins as a national entity. The seal was approved by H. Cabildo de Juanacatlán in 1993. Its creation was the responsibility of the teacher María de Lourdes Torres Alaniz, from the Municipality of Juanacatlán.

== History ==
Although "place of onions" has been claimed to be a necessarily inappropriate translation of the indigenous name (as the onions were brought by the conquistadors), the origin of the name was in fact a different, native, plant- a type of jicama or cebollita as is commonly known in the region. The Jalisco writer Juan José Arreola translates the name as "place of the good onions".

In prehispanic times, the Xonacatlan region was part of the Tololotlán kingdom, which was itself part of the feudal Tonalá kingdom, one of four kingdoms that composed the Chimalhuacana federation.

In 1529, Nuño de Guzmán arrived in the area, while conquering the kingdoms of Tonalá and Xalisco. Later, the people of Coyula, Juanacatlán, Tatepozco and Tololotlán (because their populations were so small) were defeated. On March 25, 1530, Nuño de Guzmán took formal possession of the territory in the name of the Spanish monarch.

Beginning in 1531, the natives of the Xonacatlán region were converted and evangelized in the Christian faith by the religious order of San Francisco: Friar Antonio de Segovia, Fray Juan de Padilla, Fray Andrés de Córdova and Juan de Badillo. That same year, Father Segovia founded the convent of Our Lady of the Assumption in Tetlán, near modern-day Guadalajara.

== Geography ==
The municipio of Juanacatlán in the east-central part of the state, between 20° 24' 00" and 20° 32' 15" northern latitude and between 103° 03' 10" and 103° 15' 00" west latitude, at an altitude of 1,530m.

It is bordered to the north by Tonalá and Zapotlanejo, to the south by Chapala and Poncitlán; to the east by Zapotlán del Rey, and to the west by Ixtlahuacán de los Membrillos, El Salto, and Tlajomulco de Zuñiga.

=== Climate ===
The climate of the municipio is semi-dry in winter, with dry summers, and somewhat hot without a defined winter pattern. The average annual temperature is 20.1 °C, and the average annual precipitation is 819.1 mm, with a rainy season from June to August.

The dominant winds are from the east, west, and south. There's an average of 12 freezing days per year.

=== Hydrography ===
The region's hydrography includes the Santiago River, which surrounds much of the town, and the streams that flow in the rainy season: the Colorado, Buenavista Los Corteses, La Cruz, la Tinaja, El Gallo, El Puerto, Hondo, Miseria, Chiquito, Lomelines, and Limoncillo.

There is also the Santiago River Channel and the irrigation channel deriving from the Corona Dam.

The municipio's water resources belong to the town Lerma-Chapala-Santiago basin and the Verde-Atotonilco sub-basin. Since companies appearing in the industrial corridor of El Salto have polluted the waters, the waterfall that once attracted hundreds of visitors is now a hotbed of infection, with a terrible odor, worse in times of heat. This has led to the appearance of respiratory diseases, various cancers, and heart disease. The Rio Lerma and Rio Santiago have become the most serious threats among the populations of El Salto and Juanacatlán.

Many people of Jalisco blame former President Vicente Fox's completed project, The El Cajón Dam, a hydroelectric dam on the Río Grande de Santiago in the Mexican state of Nayarit.

=== Natural resources ===
The region benefits from a natural wealth including a 933 ha forest with species such as oak, oak, ash and Tabachines, mainly.

Its main mineral resources are sandbars. Among the species of fauna are mountain lions, rabbits, squirrels, skunks, foxes, snakes, coyotes and armadillos. The soils belong to the dominant type "Vertisol pélico" and "Regosol eútrico" and the associated soil type "Feozem háplico".

In the forested region are species such as oak, giant oak, Tabachines and ash. There are also minor species such as: guamúchil, bell, captain, tepamé, mesquite, nopal, huizache, and a variety of fruit trees.

== Localities ==
Name	Population (2020)
La Aurora	16,635
Juanacatlán	9,626
San Antonio Juanacaxtle	1,564
Ex-Hacienda de Zapotlanejo	967
Miraflores	449
Casa de Teja	353
Rancho Nuevo (Estancia de Guadalupe)	336

== Economy ==
The region's key local crops are maize and sorghum. It breeds cattle, producing meat and milk, and breeds pigs, sheep, goats, horses, poultry meat and postura and colmenas. The main branch of industry is manufacturing.

Fishing in the Rio Santiago produces species such as catfish, lobina, carp and frog on a small scale for local consumption.

The Juanacatlán Lagoon is known for its landscape, for the transparency of its water and vegetation, with a surrounding forest of conifers.

The municipal seat provides financial, professional, technical, communal, social, personal and maintenance services.

== Government ==
=== Municipal presidents ===
Municipal president	Term	Political party	Notes
J. Santos Plascencia	1898		
Carlos Loza	1901		
Cayetano Rodríguez	1902		
J. Santos Plascencia	1903		
Juan Bravo y Juárez	1912		
Pedro J. Lomelí	1913		
José Ma. Parraga	1914		
José Ma. Parraga	1915		
Severiano Beltrán	1915		
Donacio Briseño	1915		
Genaro Carrillo	1915		
Carlos Maldonado	1916		
Domingo Velázquez	1916		
Domingo Velázquez	1917		
Blas Arias	1918		
Carlos Maldonado	1918		
Severiano Beltrán	1919		
Eusebio Arriaga	1919		
Conrado Arias	1919		
Lucio Casillas	1920		
Domingo Velázquez	1920		
José María Vázquez	1920		
Francisco Vega	1921		
José Velazco	1921		
José Rodríguez	1921		
Francisco Vega	1921		
Francisco Vega	1922		
Manuel Martínez	1922		
Conrado Arias	1923		
Leonardo Barba	1923		
Leonardo Barba	1924		
Eusebio Arriaga	1924		
Ramón M. Torres	1925		
Blas Casillas	1925		
Bruno Casillas	1925		
Alfredo A. Ibarra	1925		
Miguel Avilés	1927		
Blas Arias	1927		
Alfredo A. Ibarra	1928		
Lucio Casillas	1930	PNR	
Lucio Casillas	1931	PNR	
M. L. Gallardo	1932	PNR	
José Cadena	1933	PNR	
Catarino Barba	1934	PNR	
Catarino Barba	1935	PNR	
Pedro Arámbula	1935	PNR	
Salvador Martínez	1935	PNR	
Enrique Briseño	1937	PNR	
Enrique Briseño	1938	PNR	
Manuel Torres	1938	PRM	
O.D.O.C.	1940	PRM	
Enrique Briseño	1940	PRM	
Ramón González Zamora	1941	PRM	
Ramón González Zamora	1942	PRM	
Rufino Zaragoza	1943	PRM	
J. Jesús Morales	1944	PRM	
Enrique Briseño Plascencia	1945	PRM	
Enrique Briseño Plascencia	1946	PRI	
Sebastián Valenzuela	1947	PRI	
J. Guadalupe Pérez	1947	PRI	
A. Cortés	1947	PRI	
Sebastián Valenzuela	1948	PRI	
A. Cortés	1949	PRI	
José Zavala A.	1949	PRI	
José Zavala A.	1950	PRI	
José Zavala A.	1951	PRI	
José Zavala A.	1952	PRI	
Ramón F. Rivera	1956	PRI	
Pedro Villalpando	1958	PRI	
Antonio Orozco	01-01-1959–31-12-1961	PRI	
Aurelio Franco Torres	01-01-1962–31-12-1964	PRI	
Julián Casillas	01-01-1965–31-12-1967	PRI	
J. Guadalupe Maldonado Hernández	01-01-1968–31-12-1970	PRI	
J. Jesús Briseño García	01-01-1971–31-12-1973	PRI	
Fermín García	01-01-1974–31-12-1976	PRI	
Casiano Coronado	01-01-1977–31-12-1979	PRI	
J. Jesús García Briseño	01-01-1980–31-12-1982	PRI	
Esthela Cervantes de Parra	01-01-1983–31-12-1985	PRI	
Rigoberto Franco Palos	01-01-1986–31-12-1988	PRI	
Pedro Cárdenas López	01-01-1989–1992	PRI	
Mario Venegas Vizcarra	1992–1995	PAN	
Juan Olmos Flores	1995–1997	PAN	
Alfredo Torres Ibarra	01-01-1998–31-12-2000	PRI	
Raymundo Orozco Ramírez	01-01-2001–31-12-2003	PAN	
Socorro Ramírez Márquez	01-01-2004–31-12-2006	PAN	
Ramiro Tapia Ornelas	01-01-2007–31-12-2009	PRI	
Lucio Carrero García	01-01-2010–30-09-2012	PRI; Panal	Coalition "Alliance for Jalisco"
José Pastor Martínez Torres	01-10-2012–30-09-2015	PRI; PVEM	Coalition "Compromise for Jalisco"
J. Refugio Velázquez Vallín	01-10-2015–30-09-2018	MC	
Adriana Cortés González	01-10-2018–30-09-2021	MC	
Francisco de la Cerda Suárez	01-10-2021–	PAN	

== Notable people ==
- Saúl "Canelo" Álvarez – Mexican Boxer, Middleweight champion.
- Rigoberto Álvarez – Mexican Boxer, a contender in the Middleweight division.
