= Guadalajara metropolitan area =

- Metropolitan area
- Zona Metropolitana de Guadalajara (Spanish)
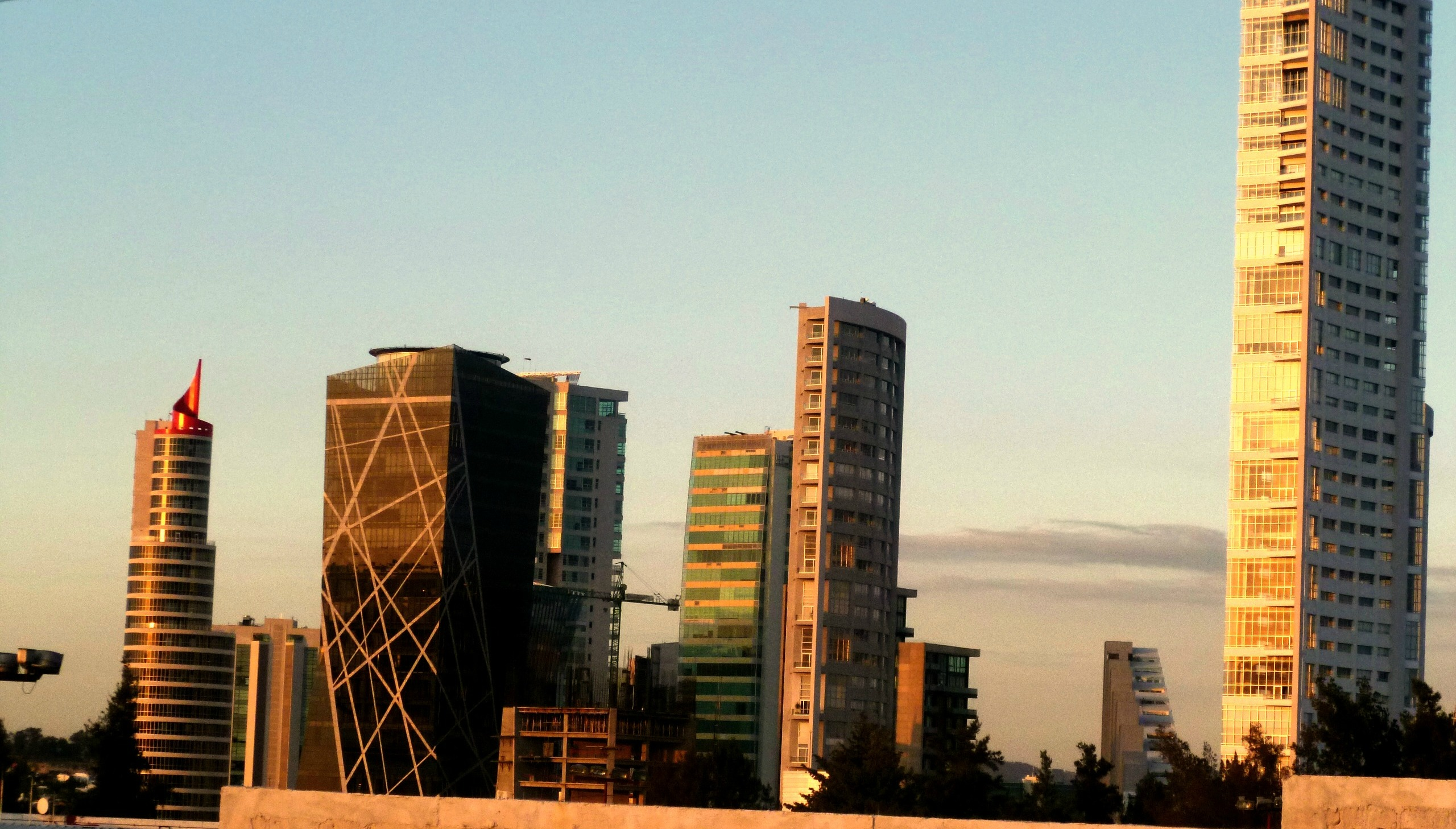
- Skyline of Puerta de Hierro in Zapopan Guadalajara metropolitan area in Mexico
Interactive map of the Guadalajara metropolitan area
Central Cities / Municipios Centrales
Outer Municipalities / Municipios Exteriores
- Country: Mexico
- State(s): Jalisco
- Largest city: Guadalajara
- Other cities: Zapopan; Tlaquepaque; Tonalá; El Salto; Tlajomulco de Zúñiga

Area
  - Total: 2,543.13 km^{2} (981.91 sq mi)
- Highest elevation: 1,870 m (6,140 ft)
- Lowest elevation: 1,050 m (3,440 ft)

Population (2020)
  - Total: 5,268,642
  - Rank: 3rd
  - Density: 2,071.71/km^{2} (5,365.7/sq mi)

GDP (PPP, constant 2015 values)
  - Year: 2023
  - Total: $123.8 billion
  - Per capita: $22,800
- Time zone: UTC−06:00 (Zona Centro)
- Area code: +52 33

The Guadalajara metropolitan area (officially, in Spanish: Zona Metropolitana de Guadalajara) is the most populous metropolitan area of the Mexican state of Jalisco and the third largest in the country after Greater Mexico City and Monterrey. It includes the core municipality of Guadalajara and the surrounding municipalities of Zapopan, Tlaquepaque, Tonalá, Tlajomulco de Zúñiga, El Salto, Ixtlahuacán de los Membrillos and Juanacatlán.

== Population ==
In 2020 the Guadalajara metropolitan area had a population of 5,268,642 distributed in eight municipalities.

Detailed Guadalajara metropolitan area population data by INEGI
No.	Municipality	Population Census 2020	Population Census 2015	Area in km^{2}	Inhabitants per km^{2} (2020)
1	Zapopan	1,476,491	1,332,272	1,017.24	1,451.46
2	Guadalajara	1,385,629	1,460,148	150.36	9,215.4
3	Tlaquepaque	687,720	664,193	118.60	5,978.65
4	Tonalá	569,913	536,111	156.5	3,641.61
5	Tlajomulco de Zúñiga	727,750	549,552	682.5	1,066.3
6	El Salto	232,852	183,437	92.39	2,520.31
7	Ixtlahuacán de los Membrillos	67,969	53,045	184.32	368.75
8	Juanacatlán	30,855	17,955	141.22	218.48
Total GMA		5,268,642	4,796,603	2,543.13	2,071.71

Total population and growth rate (INEGI, 2005)
Data	Year				
Data	1990	1995	2000	2005	2010
Total population of the GMA	3,003,868	3,482,417	3,699,136	4,095,853	4,434,878
Average annual growth rate	2,7%	1,4%		1,7%	1,55%

== See also ==
- Metropolitan Areas of Mexico
