= Juanacatlán Falls =

Waterfall on the Santiago River in Jalisco, Mexico

Coordinates: 20.5132°N 103.1752°W

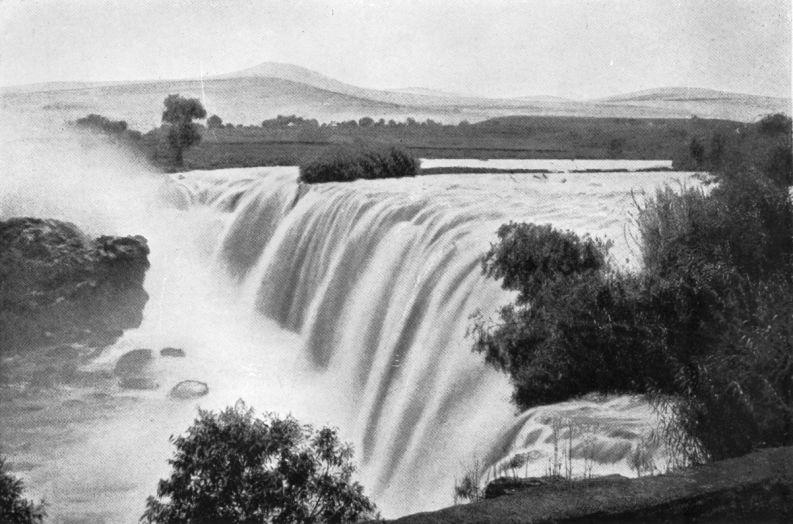
Juanacatlán Falls, circa 1909

Juanacatlán Falls (Spanish: El Salto de Juanacatlán) is a waterfall on the Santiago River in the Mexican state of Jalisco, once known as the Niagara of Mexico. Decreased flow in the Santiago River has left the falls now virtually extinct.

About thirty years ago, the falls were cleaner than ever and plenty of tourists visited it. But, now the falls have been polluted by toxic wastes, chemicals, and garbage from the factories and the nearby city of Guadalajara. These once-majestic falls, the first Mexican landscape on a postage stamp back in 1899, have been reduced to a trickle of foul-smelling effluent. At the start of the twentieth century, the falls provided hydro-electric power for Guadalajara and turned the wheels of a cotton and woolen mill, the ruins of which now stand to one side. The region where the Santiago lies is a heavily industrious area. Since the implements of the North American Free Trade Agreement or NAFTA in 1994, the region has been transformed into one of Mexico's largest industrial zones with factories dumping their wastes into the river.

There have been any people who with diseases caused by the river, and many of them have died because of the toxins that spread to the air, but the most famous incident is the boy named Miguel Angel Lopez Rocha, who was playing with his friends and accidentally slipped and fell into the river. He got out of the river and decided to keep playing until his clothes were dried. He died 18 days later because of arsenic poisoning. The river has been known to have 400 times more arsenic than the acceptable limit.

People have been known to have respiratory diseases because of the toxins that also have been spread into the air. There have been reports of Leukimia and Cancer in the nearby town of El Salto which is near the river. But it is not just Cancer and Leukemia, government health statistics have also shown that respiratory disease and kidney failure are also among the highest causes of death in El Salto.

Fortunately, the federal government recently installed a $65 million treatment plant near El Salto. The plant removes some of the foam from the river, but not heavy metal wastes. Nevertheless, the arsenic level in the river has decreased. The government estimates that cleaning the Santiago river would cost $873 million.

In February 2020 the government of Jalisco launched an investigation into the source of heavy metals and other pollutants in the Grande de Santiago River, which feeds the once-spectacular Juanacatlán Falls.
