= Ixtlahuacán de los Membrillos =

- Municipality and city
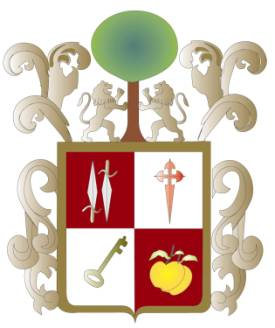
- Flag Coat of arms

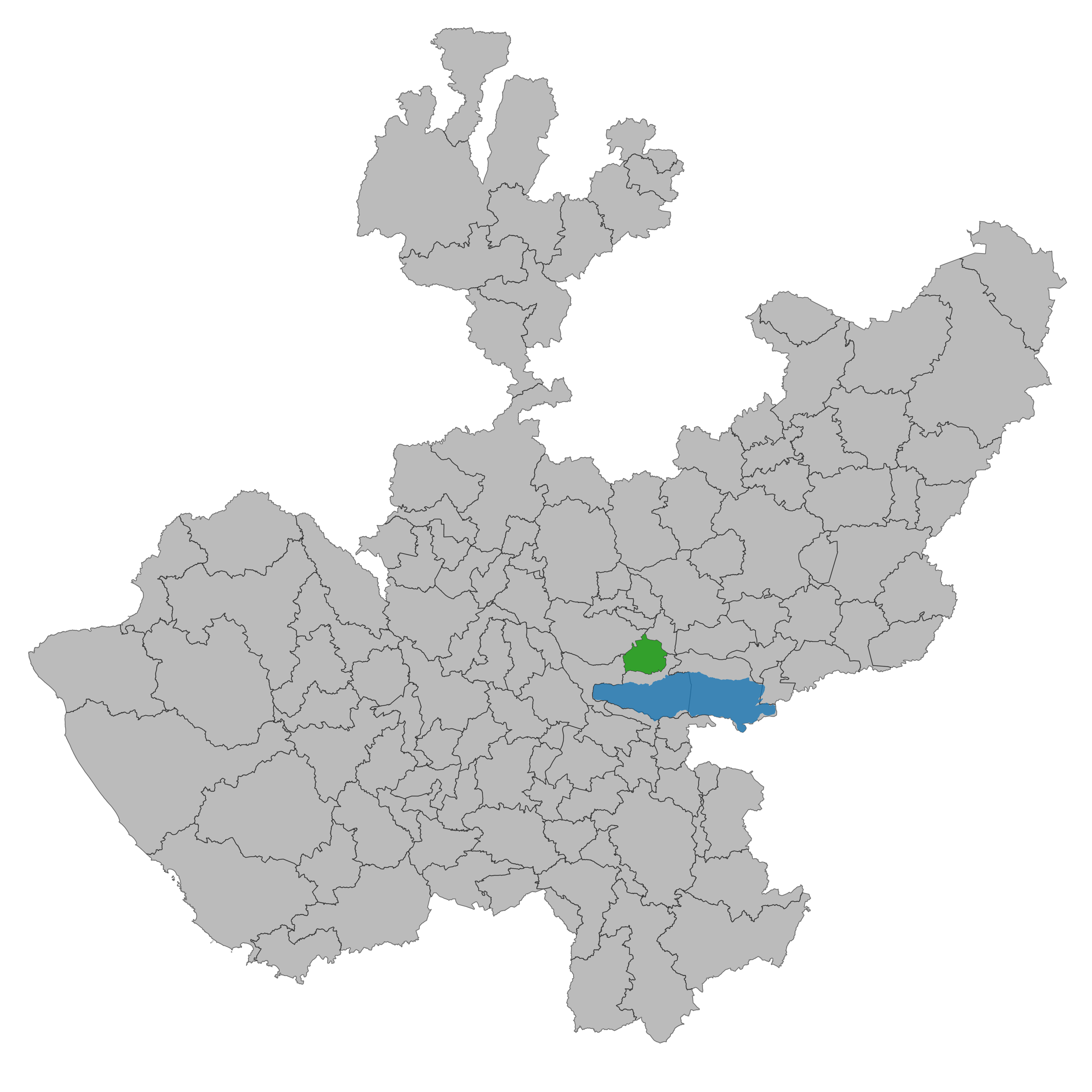
- Location of the municipality in Jalisco

- Location in Mexico
- Coordinates: 20°21′N 103°11′W
- Country: Mexico
- State: Jalisco

Area
  - Total: 184.25 km^{2} (71.14 sq mi)

Population (2005)
  - Total: 23,420
- Website: http://www.ixtlahuacandelosmembrillos.gob.mx/

Ixtlahuacán de los Membrillos is a town and municipality in Jalisco in central-western Mexico. The municipality covers an area of 184.25 km^{2}. It is located north of the Chapala municipality.

In 2005, the municipality had a total population of 23,420.

== Geography ==
Ixtlahuacan de los Membrillos is located in the center of the State, at the coordinates 20-21'00" to 20-27'30" north latitude and 103-07'20" at 103-17'00" west longitude, at a height of 1,570 metres above sea level.

It is bordered to the north by the municipalities of Tlajomulco de Zuñiga and Juanacatlán, to the south by Chapala, to the east by Juanacatlán and Chapala, and to the west by Tlajomulco de Zúñiga and Jocotepec.

Its territorial extension 184.25 km^{2}, with 94 localities, being the most important: Ixtlahuacán de los Membrillos (municipal head), Atequiza, La Capilla, Los Cedros, El Rodeo and Santa Rosa.

Flat areas represent 62% of the municipal territory, with heights of 1,500 to 1,600 meters; semi-flat zones account for 20% of the territory, with heights of 1,600 to 1,700 meters; and rugged areas account for 18% of the territory, with heights of 1,700 to 2,300 meters above sea level.

=== Climate ===
The climate is classified as semi-dry with dry winter and spring, and semi-warm without winter season. The average annual temperature is 20 °C, and an average annual rainfall of 800 millimeters with a rainfall regime in June, July and August. The prevailing winds are east and west. The average number of frost days per year is 8.

=== Natural resources ===
The resources of the municipality are part of them: the Rio Grande de Santiago-Río Santiago and the streams flowing during the los Sabinos rainy season, Los Lobos, Agua Escondida (Jalisco)' Escondida Water, Los Pinos, La Cañada and Grande.

It has storage dams: El Llano, El Carnero, Las Campanillas, La Capilla, El Carrizo and El Aniego.

The dominant soils belong to the type pelicver vertisol and planeeric sun; and as associated soil is the Haptic Feozem type.

=== Flora and fauna ===
The flora is represented by species such as Pinus-pine, oak, oyamel, eucalyptus, Laurel of India, Galeana, Pinabete, willow, sabino, ozote, mezquite, guamúchil, guaje, ash, walnut, guayabo, tepehuaje, Mangifera indica-mango, lemon tree, orange, copal, white zapote, tabachín, jacaranda, camichín, zalate, ahuilote, plum, pirul, nopal and other species.

In the fauna there are species such as coyote, oryctolagus cuniculus-rabbit, Dasypodidae-armadillo, tlacuache, squirrel and rattlesnake.

== History ==
About four kilometers west of Ixtlahuacán, at the foot of the highest hill known as "El Picacho," there is a place called "El Varal" because it is a place where "Las Varas" abound, which are long and thin sticks that were previously used to make tapeixtes, huacals, brambles, fences and huts.

In "El Varal" there is an uncovered and flat plateau where from 1513 to 1534 a tribal group from Tlajomulco de Zúñiga used to live. This group was precisely that of Don Francisco Tepotzin who had just left Tlajomulco de Zúñiga. Adjacent to "El Varal" there is another extensive paddock known all as "La Quebrada".

According to legend, in 1533, by the revelation of their god, the inhabitants of "El Varal" were aware that they should find another place to settle because the place where they were would sink and, therefore, they would die if they did not abandon it. By this same revelation they were made to know that they should go up, at night, to a high part on the hillside and that, facing east, they will seek a very bright light. That would indicate precisely where they should be established.

To the south of what is now Ixtlahuacán there was a spring known as "The Eye of Water". The water from that spring ran down to the north, so extensive puddles formed on the plain. At night, in the water of these puddles, from afar you could see the bright reflected light of the morning lucero that has become the planet Venus.

That bright light is what our ancestors of "El Varal" saw from somewhere on the mountainside "El Picacho". The hitherto inhabitants of "El Varal" according to the indicated signal moved to what is now Ixtlahuacan, but did not settle in the plain, but chose to do so in the vicinity where the spring "The Eye of Water" was still, more than four times centenary, a tree known as "Sabino". Years later, indeed if there was a considerable sinking, not exactly in what is "El Varal" but in the vicinity, in a place called "Mexiquito" but now better known as "La Quebrada". Today we still notice the depression of the terrain, although already very disguised by the thick vegetation.

=== 21st century ===
Three municipal police officers were arrested in April 2018 for the kidnapping, robbery, and murder of an employee of the Secretariat of Communications and Transportation (SCT) in 2017. The same year, the Jalisco human rights commission issued a warning against the municipal president of Ixtlahuacán for rights violations.

The May 4, 2020, arrest of Giovanni López Ramírez, a 30-year-old construction worker, and his murder while in police custody the next day, set off violent protests against police brutality in Guadalajara in June 2020 which were met by increased arrests and police repression. López's arrest was supposedly because he was not wearing a facemask outside his home during the COVID-19 pandemic in Mexico, and the demonstrations can be indirectly tied to the George Floyd protests in the United States.

== Government ==
=== Municipal presidents ===
Municipal president	Term	Political party	Notes
José Ma. Herrera	1839		
Agapito Zaragoza	1848		
Teófilo Zúñiga	1869		
Valente G. González	1870		
Margarito Bustos	1870		
José Ma. Herrera	1871		
J. Pilar González	1875		
Crecencio Velázquez	1876		
Lázaro Herrera	1876		
Mónico García	1876		
José Ma. Herrera	1878		
Pantaleón Mendoza	1878		
Leandro Mendoza	1879		
Mateo Luna	1879–1880		
Marcelino Díaz	1880–1881		
Georgino Zúñiga	1881		
Teófilo Zúñiga	1883		
Maximino Mendoza	1884		
Teófilo Zúñiga	1884		
Mateo Luna	1885		
Hilario Hernández	1886		
Mateo Luna	1886		
Teófilo Zúñiga	1886–1887		
Mateo Luna	1888		
Lázaro Herrera	1889		
Marcelino Herrera	1889		
Teófilo Zúñiga	1890		
Maximino Mendoza	1891		
Mateo Luna	1892		
Petronilo Herrera	1892		
Teófilo Zúñiga	1893–1894		
Rosalío Zaragoza	1895		
Onofre Díaz	1896		
Rosalío Luna	1897		
Marcelino Díaz	1898		
Eulogio Herrera	1899		
Juan Langruen	1900		
Mateo Luna	1901		
Francisco Zúñiga	1902		
Eulogio Herrera	1903		
Mateo Luna	1903		
Onofre Díaz	1904		
Eulogio Herrera	1905		
Anacleto Zúñiga	1906		
J. Pilar Zúñiga	1907		
Anacleto Zúñiga	1907		
Adalberto Herrera	1908		
Eulogio Herrera	1909		
Eusebio Casillas	1910		
J. Guadalupe	1910		
Eulogio Herrera	1911		
Crescencio Zúñiga	1911		
Anacleto Zúñiga	1911		
Quirino Zarazoza	1911		
Eusebio Casillas	1912		
Manuel Zaragoza	1913		
Juan A. García	1913		
Eulogio Herrera	1914		
Juan G. González	1914–1915		
Florentino Zaragoza	1915		
J. Santos Zaragoza	1915–1916		
Bonifacio Neri	1916		
J. Encarnación García	1916		
J. Santos García	1916–1917		
Bonifacio Neri	1917		
Crecencio Zúñiga	1918		
Adalberto Herrera	1919		
Valente D. González	1920		
Amado Gómez	1920		
Anacleto Zúñiga	1920		
Ramón Díaz	1921		
Eusebio Casillas	1921		
Aureliano Díaz	1922–1923		
Crecencio Zúñiga	1924		
Julio C. Díaz	1924		
Ignacio Lepe	1925		
Timoteo García	1926		
J. Jesús Zaragoza	1927		
Agustín Mendoza	1927		
Pedro Velázquez	1928		
Agustín Mendoza	1929		
J. Jesús Zaragoza R.	1929	PNR	
José María Herrera	1930	PNR	
Nabor Langruen	1931	PNR	
Pedro Velázquez	1931	PNR	
Manuel Cuevas	1931	PNR	
Isidro Rodríguez	1932	PNR	
J. Jesús Zaragoza	1932	PNR	
Pedro Cervantes	1932	PNR	
J. Jesús Zaragoza R.	1933	PNR	
Isidro Martínez L.	1934	PNR	
Aureliano Díaz	1935	PNR	
Maximiliano García	1936	PNR	
Conrado Ortiz	1937	PNR	
Timoteo García	1937	PNR	
José Mora	1938	PNR	
Apolonio Carrillo	1938	PRM	
Simón Rodríguez	1939	PRM	
Julián Aguilar L.	1940	PRM	
Rafael Ramírez	1941–1942	PRM	
Ramón Coronado	1942	PRM	
Maximiliano García	1943–1944	PRM	
Apolonio Carrillo	1945	PRM	
J. Jesús Cervantes	1946	PRI	
J. Refugio Aguilar	1947–1948	PRI	
José Mendoza V.	1949–1952	PRI	
Merced Ramírez	1953	PRI	Acting municipal president
J. Refugio Aguilar	1953–1955	PRI	
Ramón C. Ramírez	1956–1958	PRI	
Julián Aguilar L.	1959–1960	PRI	
Juan Zaragoza Íñiguez	1961	PRI	Acting municipal president
Salvador Herrera S.	01-01-1962–31-12-1964	PRI	
Eva Herrera Becerra	01-01-1965–31-12-1967	PRI	
J. Trinidad Mendoza H.	01-01-1968–31-12-1970	PRI	
Juan Manuel Zaragoza Íñiguez	01-01-1971–31-12-1973	PRI	
David Díaz Ramírez	01-01-1974–31-12-1976	PRI	
Pedro Salvador Sánchez Zepeda	01-01-1977–31-12-1979	PRI	
Juan José Herrera Arreola	01-01-1980–31-12-1982	PRI	
Raúl Ramírez Real	01-01-1983–31-12-1985	PRI	
María Elba Díaz Ramírez	01-01-1986–31-12-1988	PRI	
Juan Pablo Guardiola Zúñiga	01-01-1989–1992	PRI	
Conrado Ramírez García	1992–1995	PRI	
José Antonio Aguilar Enciso	1995–1997	PAN	
José de Jesús López Covarrubias	01-01-1998–2000	PRI	
Refugio Silva Vega	2000	PRI	Acting municipal president
Aurelio Díaz Aguilar	01-01-2001–31-12-2003	PRI	
Ramón Ramírez Hernández	01-01-2004–31-12-2006	PAN	
Octavio Coronado Vargas	01-01-2007–31-12-2009	PAN	
Carlos Méndez Gutiérrez	01-01-2010–2012	PRI; Panal	Coalition "Alliance for Jalisco"
Marco Antonio Díaz Carrazco	2012	PRI; Panal	Coalition "Alliance for Jalisco". Acting municipal president
Sergio Ramón Quintero González	01-10-2012–30-09-2015	PRI; PVEM	Coalition "Compromise for Jalisco"
Eduardo Cervantes Aguilar	01-10-2015–30-03-2018	PRI	Applied for a temporary leave, to run for reelection, which he got
Carlos Méndez Gutiérrez	31-03-2018–2018	PRI	Acting municipal president
Eduardo Cervantes Aguilar	01-10-2018–30-09-2021	PRI	Was reelected on 01-07-2018
José Heriberto García Murillo	01-10-2021–	PRI	
