= El Salto, Jalisco =

El Salto
- Municipality and city
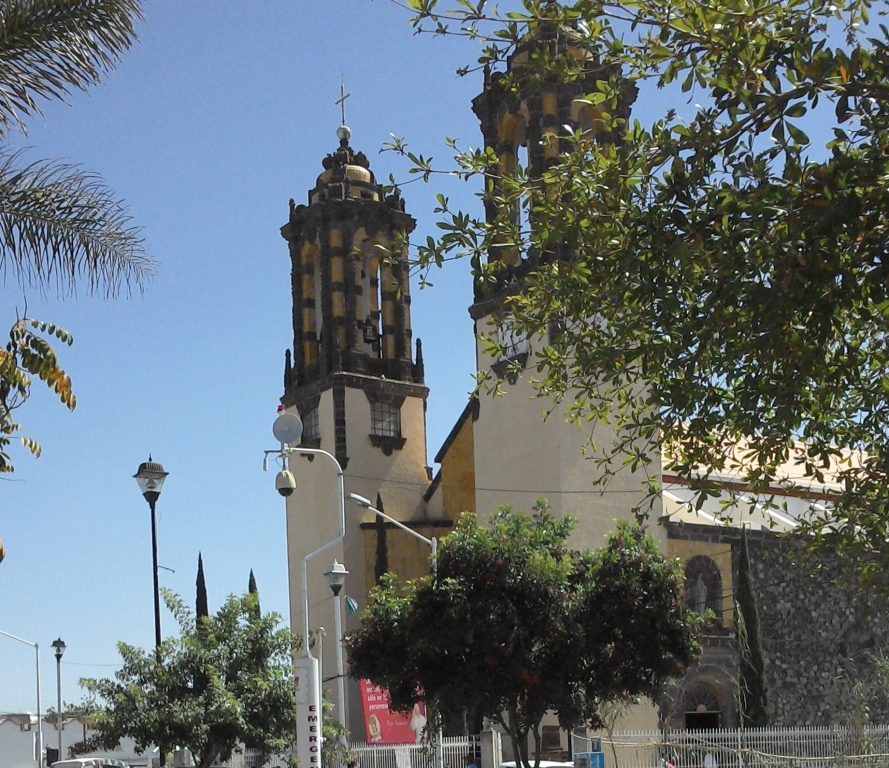

- Coat of arms

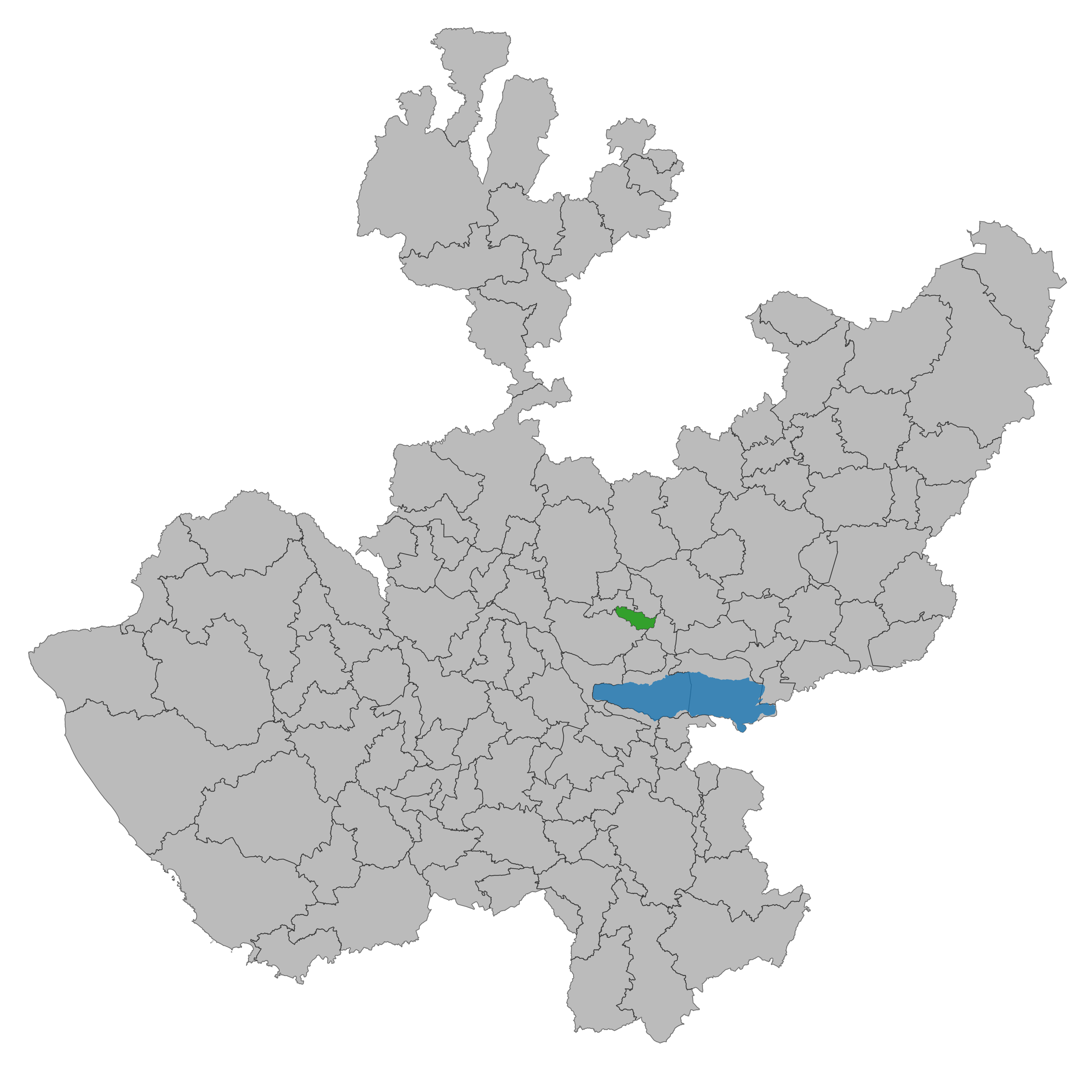
- Location of the municipality in Jalisco

- Location in Mexico El Salto (Jalisco)
- Coordinates: 20.51605°N 103.17835°W
- Country: Mexico
- State: Jalisco

Area
  - Total: 92.75 km^{2} (35.81 sq mi)
  - City: 6.28 km^{2} (2.42 sq mi)

Population (2020 census)
  - Total: 232,852
  - Density: 2,511/km^{2} (6,502/sq mi)
  - City: 27,876
  - City density: 4,440/km^{2} (11,500/sq mi)
- Website: www.elsalto.gob.mx

El Salto is a city, and the surrounding municipality of the same name, in the central region of the Mexican state of Jalisco.

The municipality covers a surface area of 92.75 km^{2} (35.81 sq mi) with a population of 232,852. It is surrounded, in a clockwise direction from the north, by the municipalities of Tlaquepaque, Tonalá, Juanacatlán, and Tlajomulco de Zúñiga. It was created on 22 December 1943, with its excision from the municipality of Juanacatlán.

== History ==
In 1530, the Spanish conqueror of Mexico, Hernán Cortés, commissioned Nuño de Guzmán to conquer "inland". This part to the conquest of the kingdom of Michoacán, venturing to conquer new lands was launched towards the West. Thus, on 20 January 1530, the expedition crosses the Lerma river through Cuitzeo and walking northwest, appears in front of Tonalá on 24 March, taking possession of the village, one of the largest in the region, leaving the entire region subjugated to the Spanish kingdom. The next day, 25 March, Nuño de Guzmán, takes possession in the name of the King of Spain from the regions south of the Santiago River and north and west of Lake Chapala, reserving for himself the title of entrustment, taking over the Valleys of Toluquilla and Tonalá. Diego de Porres Baranda, one of the richest men in Nueva Galicia who had acquired his first lands in the Cocula Valley in 1580 and had become one of the most important food suppliers of Guadalajara in the first decade of the century XVII, in a real hearing held on 30 February, 1606, receives a Mayorazgo according to the command agreed by the President of the Royal Audience Don Alonso Pérez Mechana, in which he was granted "a place of stay for small and five cattle Knights of land in the jurisdiction of the town and Santa Fe Valley, between this and Juanacatlán.

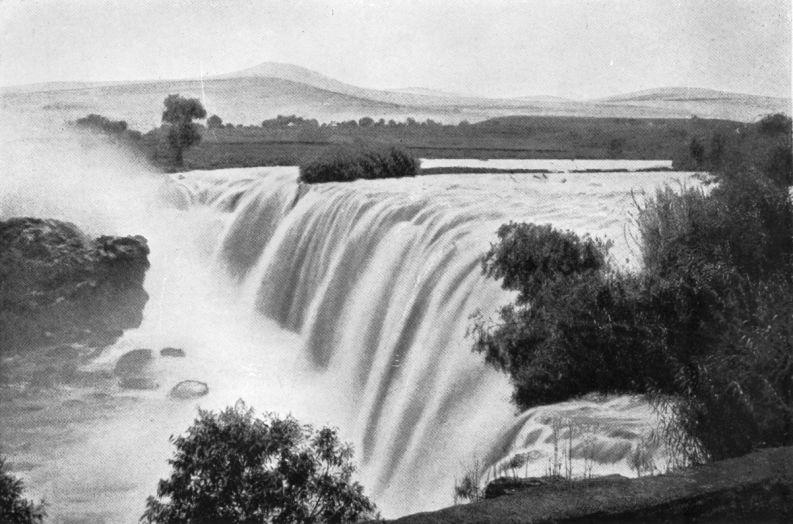
Juanacatlán Falls

In the seventeenth century the Toluquilla hacienda extended from the town of Analco to the waterfall of El Salto de Juanacatlán and was one of the largest estates belonged to the Company of Jesus or Jesuitas, religious institute of clergy . In June 1767, the King Carlos III, promulgates his Royal Decree, where he expels all the clerics of the Company of Jesus, Spanish Territory, leaving the Treasury of Toluquilla in the hands of Mr. Francisco Javier de Vizcarra, first Marquis of Pánuco. In 1818, the existence of the "Jesús María" estate is recorded. The hacienda had a very special characteristic, there was the famous Juanacatlán Falls, an impressive waterfall that the large river of Santiago makes in this place. That fall that reached almost twenty meters high and whose curtain was over a hundred and thirty meters long. In 1836, Don Francisco Martínez Negrete Ortiz de Rozas, a Basque immigrant from Lanestosa, Viscaya region in Spain and a very important merchant from the era in Guadalajara, acquires the Treasury of "El Castillo". The lands are transformed into irrigation lands taking advantage of the waters of the Río Grande Santiago and planting cane, chickpea and alfalfa. On the left bank of the Río Grande Santiago, near the water fall, a trapiche moved by animal force was installed and the water was channeled to irrigate the cane grooves. Once the product was finished, it was transported to Guadalajara in carts pulled by oxen. This place was called the farm "El Molino". With the ranch "El Castillo" and later the Hacienda de "Jesús María", the ranch "La Azucena" and the Hacienda de "El Molino" formed what is now known as El Salto. When Francisco Martínez Negrete Ortiz de Rozas dies, the estates with an extension of 12,319 hectares are inherited by his eldest daughter María Dolores Martínez Negrete y Alba, married to José María Bermejillo Ybarra, a prosperous merchant and Spanish businessman from the town of Balmaseda in the Viscaya region in Spain.

=== 2012 political crisis ===
The municipality of El Salto suffered polarization because of the municipal elections of 1 July 2012, where the inhabitants accused a candidate and his family of caciquismo (i.e. being political bosses). The candidate Joel González Diaz was criticized because in 2007 he and his brother Gerardo González allegedly ordered Martín Ruvalcaba to be killed and in 2009 the mayorality passed from Joel González Díaz to Gerardo. In 2012 Joel registered his candidacy for municipal president for the second time.

Multiple reports of abuse of authority, arrogance and mistreatment were made by the opposition candidates, but these were never able to curb the candidacy of Joel González Díaz. An opposition group made up of various sectors of the opposition was formed to prevent that Joel González Díaz from again taking the municipal presidency.

Despite all, the results of the municipal elections were as follows:

- PRI and PVEM 22,143 votes
- PAN 19,393 votes
- MC and PT 11,070 votes

Despite challenges, and the July 2 March that brought together 10,000 opponents of the state court, handed down his sentence in favor of Joel González Díaz for what he was legitimized since in reality there were no more than five hundred protesters.

=== Drug war ===
Eighteen plastic bags with body parts were discovered in February 2021. Add these to the 113 bodies found in secret graves in November 2020 and the total 189 corpses found in 2020. The findings seem to be related to the Mexican drug war and the Jalisco New Generation Cartel (CJNG).

== Localities ==
Name	Population (2020)	Area
Las Pintas	42,576	6.81 km^{2}
San José del Castillo	39,246	5.08 km^{2}
Las Pintitas	29,445	8.9 km^{2}
El Salto	27,876	6.28 km^{2}
San José el Verde (El Verde)	21,834	5.89 km^{2}
El Quince (San José el Quince)	21,215	4.57 km^{2}
Galaxia Bonito Jalisco	20,381	1.26 km^{2}
Agua Blanca	11,505	0.13 km^{2}

== Pollution ==
The municipality of El Salto is located on the banks of Río Grande de Santiago, one of the largest and most polluted in the country. Its waters are loaded with waste from the large factories of the industrial corridor and coming from the Guadalajara Metropolitan Area. The construction of the retaining wall at the top of the waterfall, which was used to channel the water to the hydroelectric plant, conserves the contaminated water that ends up stagnant, retaining toxic sludge and becoming a focus of infection and swarms of mosquitoes that attack the population and transmit diseases. The pestilence of water and its high level of pollutants ends up torrentially affecting the health of the inhabitants, since it can be said that in El Salto there is neither water nor clean air, affecting the flora, fauna and fertility of the place in the same way . Among the main health effects that occur in the municipality are: congenital malformations, abortions, allergies, respiratory infections, bronchial asthma, leukemia, lymphomas, renal insufficiency, urticaria, conjunctivitis, vertigo, chronic headache, among others.

== Music ==
In El Salto Jalisco, it has been characterized by hosting musical groups with a lot of popularity, either inside and outside the municipality, such as:

'Bands'

- The Dominant Band El Cerrito
- Youth Star Band
- Banda Los Chicos Tambora
- Los Rosalitos Band

'Groups'

- Latin Renewal Group
- Tropical Latino Group
- Latin Rhythm Group
- Latin Monkeys
- Argos
- Sonora Tattoo (from Juanacatlan, Jalisco, neighboring municipality).

== Festivals ==
Civil holidays

- Anniversary of the Independence of Mexico: 16 September.
- Anniversary of the Mexican Revolution: 20 November.

Religious festivals

- Holy Week: Thursday and Good Friday.
- Feast in honor of the Admirable Virgin Mother: from 12 to 20 October.
- Festivities in honor of the Holy Cross of La Parroquia La Santa Cruz In El Salto: from 25 April to 3 May.
- Festivities in honor of San Isidro Labrador, in the Pints: From 7 to 15 May.
- Festivities in honor of San Jose, in San José del Castillo: 11–19 March.

== Notable people ==
- Mike Laure: singer, songwriter and actor

== Activist groups ==
Caution Collective, a group of citizens with initiative to change. Created in January 2011, it aims to improve the quality of life of the inhabitants of El Salto with the promotion of culture and the arts, and that citizens demonstrate their skills, their desire to live in a better environment, their strength to face social problems and desires to contribute to the formation of the identity of the municipality.

== Government ==
Its form of government is democratic make up 16 councilors, who with a simple majority make decisions about the municipality, are 6 opposition councilors and 10 of the ruling party. It depends on state government and federal. Elections are held every 3 years.

=== Municipal presidents ===
Term	Municipal president	Political party	Notes
1983-1985	J. Jesús López Salcido	PRI	
1985	Ángel Jiménez Barragán	PRI	
1986-1988	Olivia Orozco Torres	PRI	
1989-1992	Abel Palomares Gutiérrez	PRI	
1992-1995	José de Jesús Martínez Ponce	PRI	
1995-1997	Carlos Dueñas Lomelí	PAN	
1998-2000	José de Jesús Romo Huerta	PRI	
2001-2003	José de Jesús González Cuevas	PAN	
2004-2006	Bertha Alicia Moreno Álvarez	PAN	
2007-2009	Joel González Díaz	PRI	
2009	José Alberto Contreras Díaz	PRI	Acting municipal president
2010-2012	Gerardo González Díaz	PRI; Panal	
2012-2015	Joel González Díaz	PRI; PVEM	
2015-2018	Marcos Godínez Montes	PRI	
01/10/2018-28/02/2021	Ricardo Zaid Santillán Cortés	PAN; PRD; MC	Applied for a temporary leave to run for reelection
01/03/2021-2021	Guadalupe Torres Olide	PAN; PRD; MC	Acting municipal president
2021-	Ricardo Zaid Santillán Cortés	MC	He was reelected on 06/06/2021

== Hydrography ==
The municipality belongs to the Lerma-Santiago hydrological region. Its hydrological resources are provided by several rivers and streams that are part of the sub-basin Santiago river (Verde-Atotonilco), belonging to the hydrological region Lerma-Chapala-Santiago. The main river is Santiago where the waterfall of El Salto de Juanacatlán is located. There are also the Ahogado stream and some springs, such as that of Cerro Colorado and de la Cruz.

The Santiago River is one of the 11 most polluted rivers in the country, according to the National Water Commission (Conagua). The main sources of pollution are sewage from homes and hundreds of industrial discharges. The serious consequence of this contamination is the damage to people's health. The 120 thousand inhabitants of El Salto and Juanacatlán suffer from it with frequent conditions. The death of the river began about 40 years ago. In 1971 the first effects of the serious contamination appeared. Where before was the famous waterfall known as the "Mexican Niagara", now there is brown water that drags white foam, which in times of air flies and spreads.
