= Tonalá, Jalisco =

City and municipality in Jalisco, Mexico

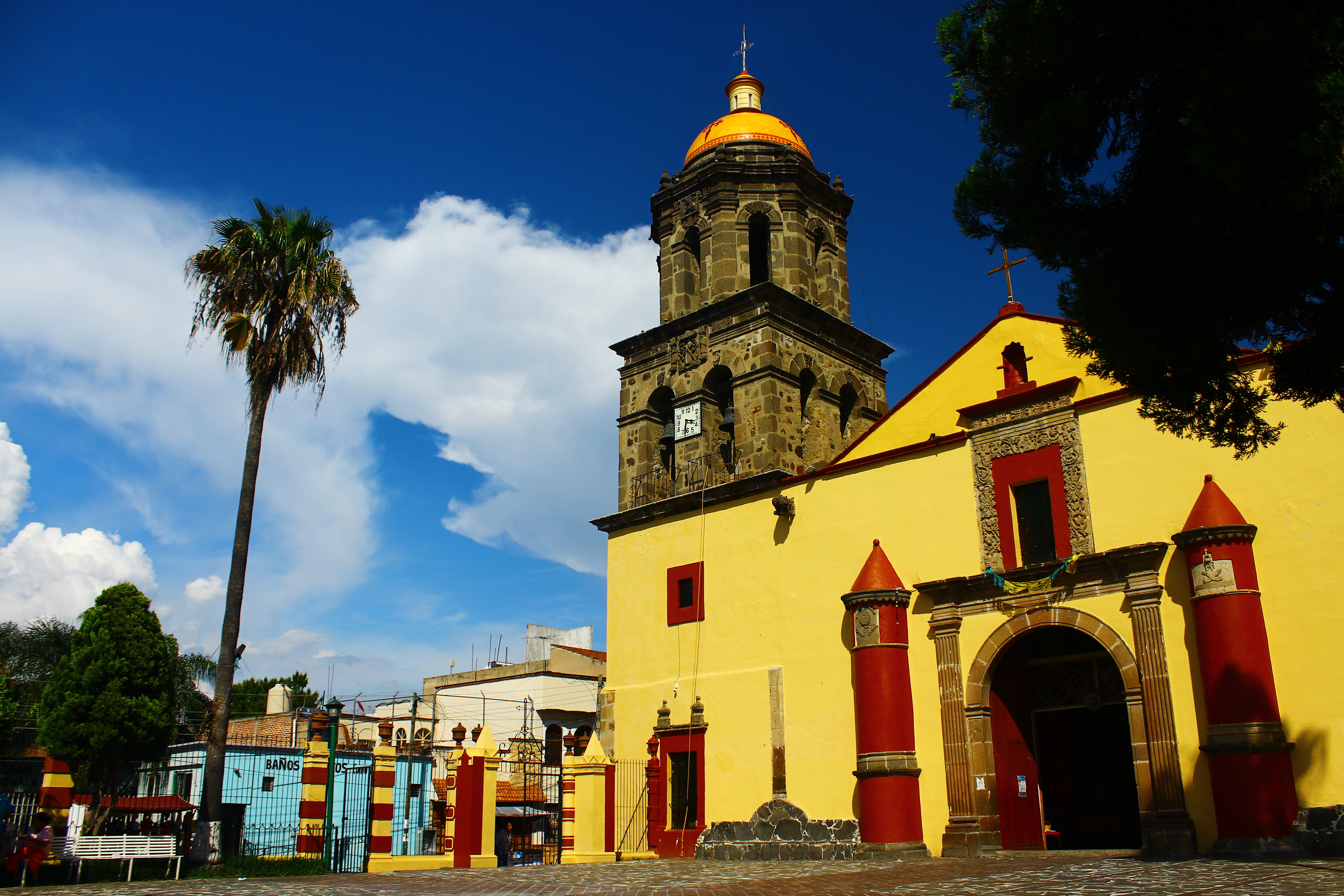
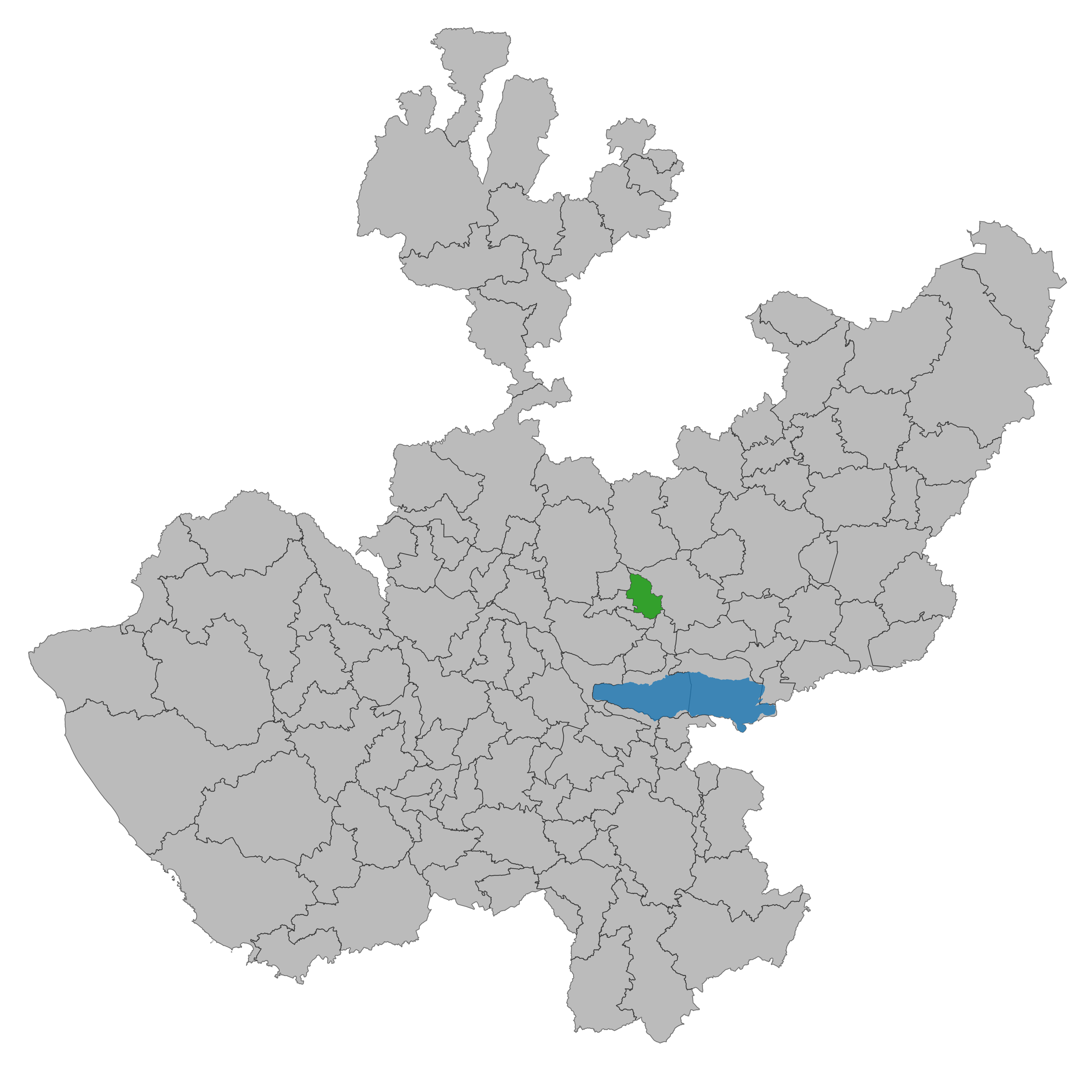
Tonalá
Church in Tonalá
Coat of arms
Location
Location in the State of Jalisco
Administration
Country	Mexico
State	Jalisco
Region	Región Centro
Metropolitan Area	Guadalajara Metropolitan Area
Municipality • Neighborhoods	Tonalá; 193
Municipal president	Sergio Armando Chávez Dávalos (2021-)
Political party	Morena
Geography
City Area	51.66 km^{2}
Metro Area	2,740 km^{2}
Elevation	1,540 m
Coordinates :	20°37′N 103°14′W
Population
City Population (2020)	442,440 city; 569,913 municipality
Metro Population (2020)	5,268,642 (Rank 3)
City Density	8,564/km^{2}
Metro Density	1,897.29/km^{2}
General Information
Demonym	Tonalteca
Time Zone	CST (UTC−6)
Postal Code	45400–45429
Area Code	+52 (Mexico) / +33 (Jalisco)
Website – H. Ayuntamiento de Tonalá

Tonalá (Spanish pronunciation: [tonaˈla]) is a city and municipality within the Guadalajara Metropolitan Area in the state of Jalisco in Mexico. With a population of 442,440, it is the fourth largest city in the state, the other three being the other major population centres in the metro area: Guadalajara, Zapopan, and Tlaquepaque. It is best known as a major handcrafts center for Jalisco, especially pottery, as well as its very large Thursday and Sunday street market, dedicated to handcrafts.

== The city ==
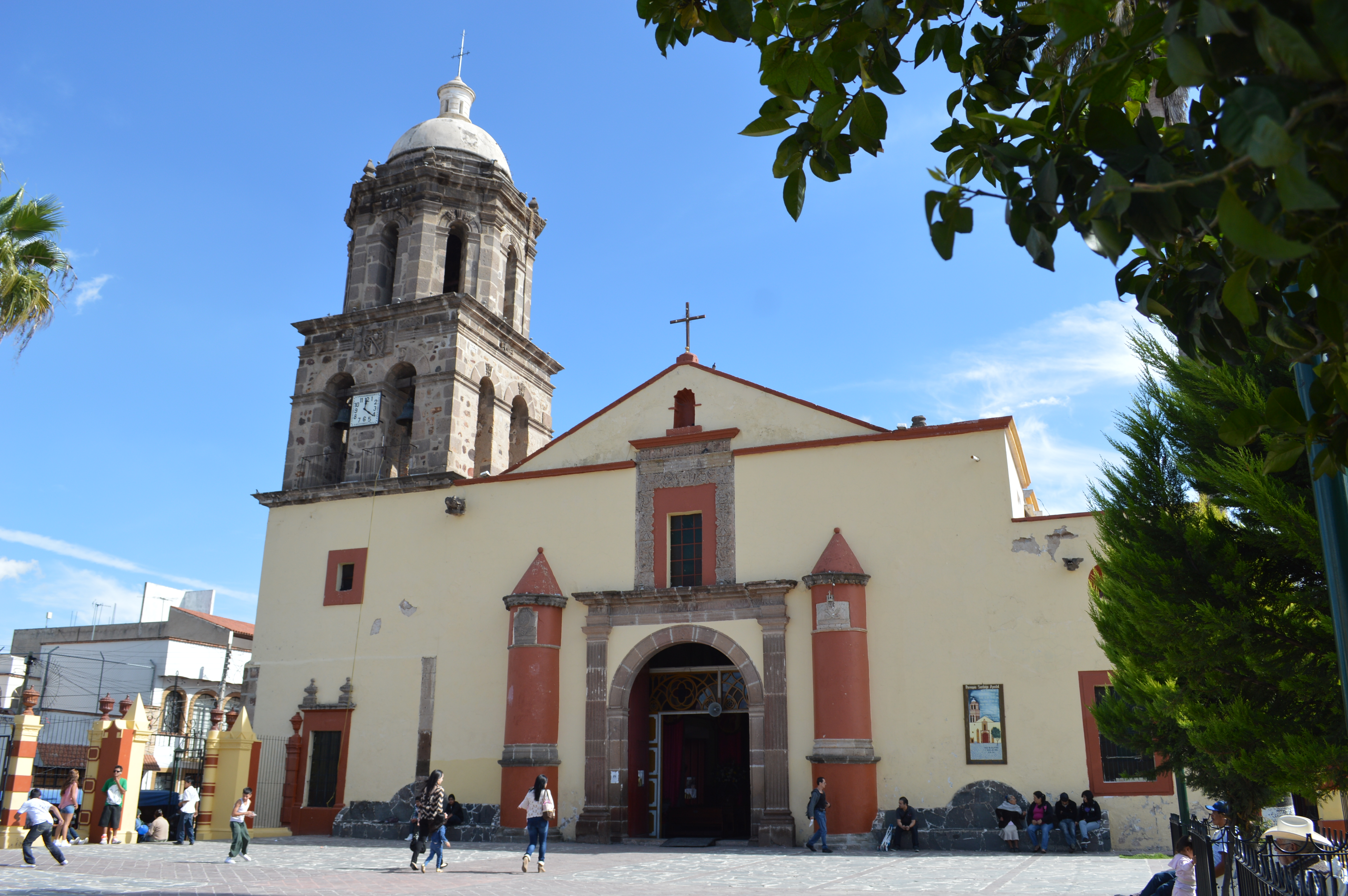
Santiago Apostol Parish

The "municipal palace" or local government building is distinguished by its clock tower and arches, which are decorated in ceramic tiles in traditional motifs. There are also ceramic murals created by Salvador Vázquez and Francisco Basulto. In 2013, the local government opened an exhibition hall and museum in the building called the Tonalá Puebla-Museo, to promote local handcrafts, arts and culture.

The main church for the city is the Santiago Apostol Parish. Constructed in the 16th century, it is the second oldest standing church in the Valley of Atemajac. It is best known as the site of the masked Dance of the Tastoanes, performed in honor of Saint James on July 25. The atrium of the church as a monument to Pius IX, created in 1887. The facade of the church is of sandstone; the sides have buttresses decorated in vegetative motifs and one side has a medallion with an anagram and the date of March 24, 1813 and lion gargoyles. The main entrance is flanked by pilasters that support a frieze. Above this is the choir window framed in vegetation in relief topped by a niche. There is a single bell tower with two levels. The interior consists of three naves and vaulted ceiling, with a Neo Classical main altar.

Capilla de la Cruz Blanca (White Cross Chapel) is where the first mass in western Mexico was said in 1530 by Franciscan friars. The exterior is sober, made of stone and the facade has two small bell towers. The interior contains murals that represent the native flora and fauna of the area. The Santuario del Sagrado Corazón (Sacred Heart Sanctuary) was built in the 19th century in Gothic style over what was the Nuestra Señora de la Soledad Hospital. The interior feature a very large oil painting of "Via Crucis" depicting the stations of the cross. The San Gaspar Parish dates from the 16th century, named in honor of one of the Three Kings. Another 16th-century parish is Purisima Concepción.

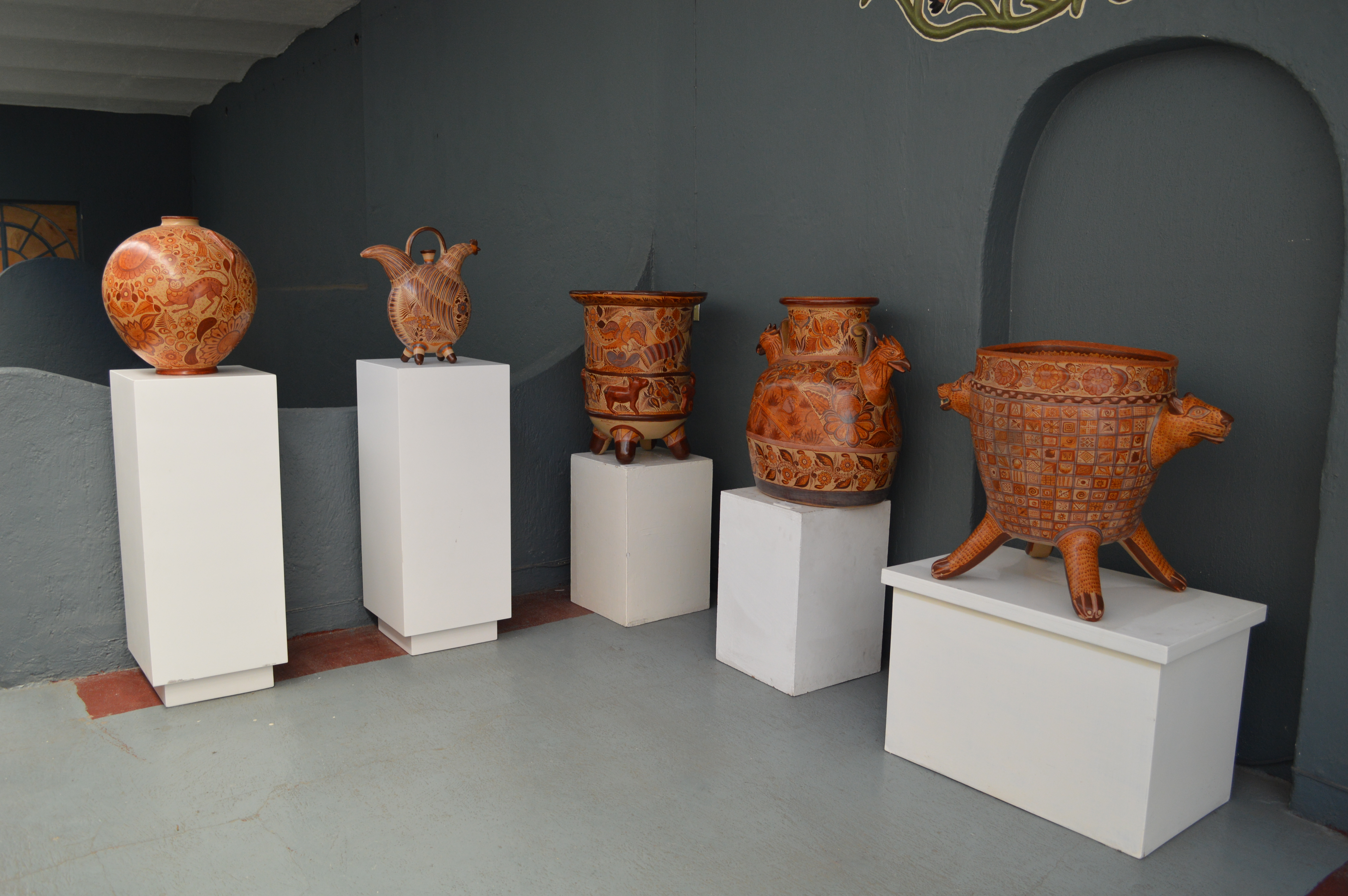
Exhibit at the Museo Nacional de la Cerámica

Main cultural centers are the Museo Nacional de la Cerámica, the Casa de Artesanos and the Museo Tonallan. The Museo Nacional de la Cerámica is mostly dedicated to Jalisco ceramics, especially that of Tonalá. There are halls dedicated to ceramics from other parts of the country as well as a hall dedicated to miniatures. The museum has a collection of about 500 pieces from the pre Hispanic period to contemporary winners of various competitions. It was founded in 1986, by a group of businessmen along with artisans Jorge Wilmot and Ken Edwards in Wilmot's former home. The initial collection came from the Instituto Nacional Indigenista (National Indigenous Institute), which has been since augmented by winners from the Certamen Estatal de la Cerámica (Jalisco State Ceramic Contest). The museum closed for a year in 1995 but has been open since 1996 despite financial problems. Most pieces are bruñido, bandera, petatillo and canelo, the most common types produced in Tonalá.

The Tonallán Museum contains exhibits related to the municipality's history, dances such as the Tastoanes and handcrafts from the pre Hispanic era to the present. It has three halls, one dedicated to painting, sculpture and handcrafts/folk art, another to archeology and traditional ceramics and the last to the Tastoanes dance. It also offers interactive workshops for schools in pottery.

The Tonalá Regional Museum is in a rustic adobe building. It hosts temporary exhibits by artists and artisans of the region.

One other cultural institution is the Casa de Artesanos. It has various areas that sell the area's handcrafts including the Casa de los Artesanos, which is noted for its murals and a permanent collection of the best of the town's work.

Overlooking the town is the Cerro de la Reina (Queen's Hill), named after the last indigenous ruler of Tonalá, Cihualpilli. At its summit, there is a monument to her, a chapel dedicated to the Virgin of Guadalupe and a flagpole holding Jalisco's highest Mexican flag, the sixth highest in the country. The hill was originally site for the queen's home.

One of the most important popular festivals is the Fiestas de Sol (Sun Festivals) which occurs in the first half of April. It features artisans from all over Jalisco along with traditional dance, food, parades, the election of a queen, cultural and musical events and more. The Festival of Santa Cruz occurs in May and is marked by processions in each of the city's neighborhoods, centered on the carrying of a cross. Saint James, the patron of the city, is celebrated on July 25. This event is distinguished by the dance of the matachines and the Tastoanes, done only here. The Tastoanes dance symbolized the battles between the indigenous and the conquistadors in the 16th century. One of the main characters is Saint James himself, who according to tradition appeared during the fight to help the Spanish. The municipality hosts the annual Concurso Nacional de la Cerámica, with a purse of about 600,000 pesos for original ceramic pieces. The event attracts artisans from Michoacán, Oaxaca, Chihuahua, the State of Mexico and Jalisco. It is sponsored by the Instituto de la Artesania Jalisciense and the Fondo Nacional para el Fomento de las Artesanías.

== The municipality ==
The city of Tonalá functions as the local government for 58 other communities, which cover a territory of 119.58 km^{2} (46.17 sq mi). It is bordered by the municipalities of Zapotlanejo, El Salto, Juanacatlán, Tlaquepaque and Guadalajara. The city is the largest community with a population of 408,759, followed by Puente Grande (5,664), Coyula (29,674), Centro de Readaptación Social (13,071) and La Punta (4,889) (2010 figures). The municipal government consists of a president, eleven representatives and a syndic, which are elected every three years.

Outside of the municipal seat, important landmarks include the Santa Cruz de las Huertas Church, the parishes of Coyula and Tololotlán, all in colonial style, the main bridge over the Santiago River, the Garita del Puente Grande from the 18th century and the former Arroyo de Emmedio hacienda.

== History ==
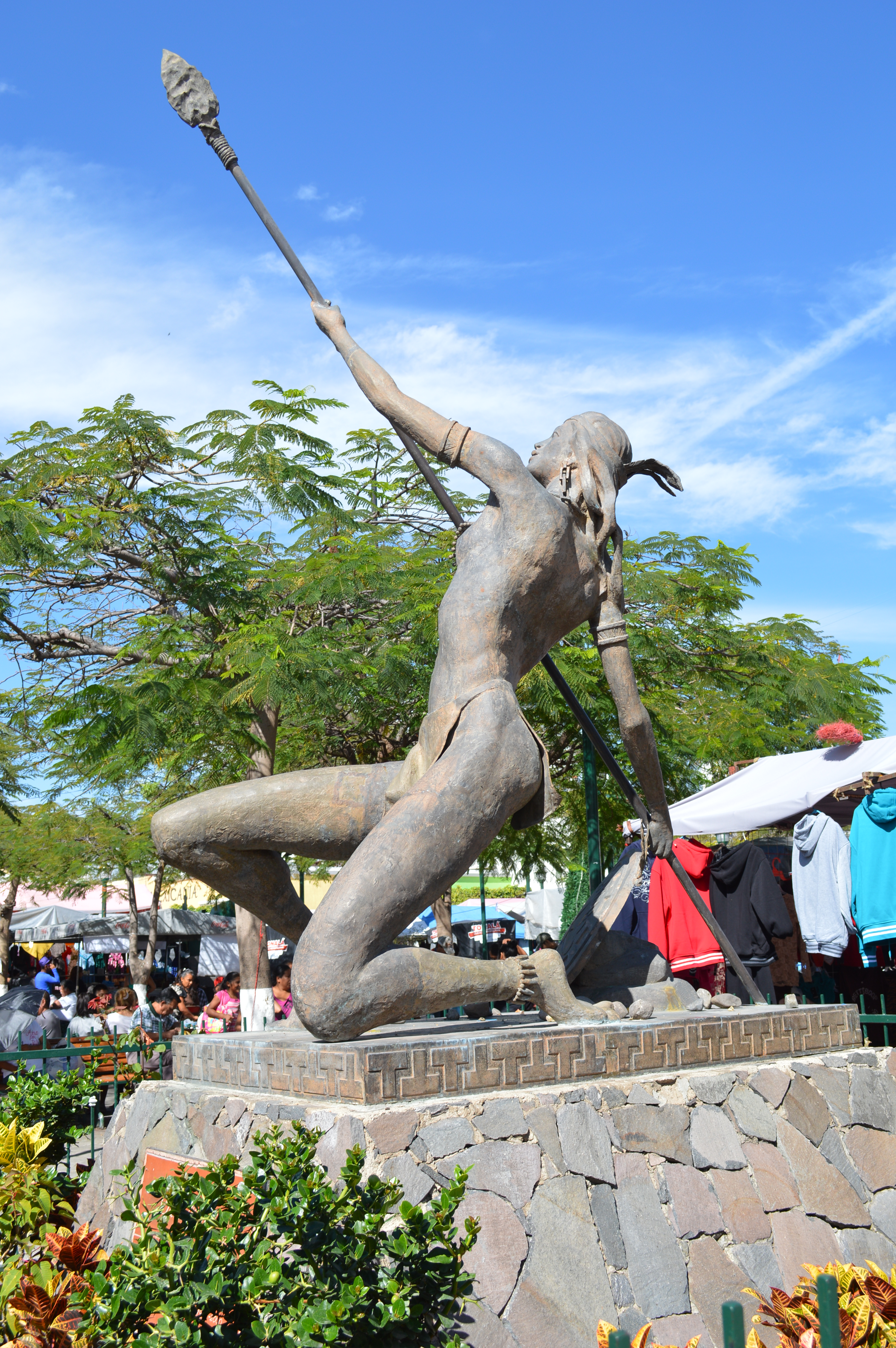
Monument to Cihuapilli in the main town square

The name comes from the Nahuatl phrase Tonallán, which means "Where the Sun rises". The town approved its seal (coat of arms) in 1985, designed by Rogelio Contreras Colina.

The town started as a Zapotec settlement, which latter incorporated Toltec and Nahua migrants, leading to a blending of cultures. Another influence were the nomadic Cocos and Tecuexes, who also lived in the area. Religious practice focused on gods such as Teoplizintli (child god), Heri (sciences) and Nayart (god of war), along with Tenaguachi and Tezcatipoca.

During the Salitre War in 1510, the Purépecha invaded the area, which at that time was a dominion, however, this effort was defeated.

When Nuño de Guzmán and the Spanish arrived in 1530, the town was the capital of a dominion ruled by a woman named Cihualpilli Tzapotzinco. This dominion included Tlaquepaque, Tololotlán, Coyolán, Mexquitán, Tzalatitán, Atemajac, Tetlán, Tateposco, Tlaxomulco, Cuescomatitán, Coyutlán and Toluquilla as tribute paying entities.

The leaders of the dominion were divided on how to respond to the foreigners. Cihualpilli did not want to resist, due to Spanish power, but local leaders, notably those from Coyolan, Ichcatán, Tzalatitán, and Tetlán wanted to resist. Cihualpilli sent gifts to Guzmán, who not only demanded more, but also demanded allegiance to the Spanish king. Dissidents gathered numbering about 3,000 and attacked the Spanish. This began a battle that lasted several hours, with a Spanish victory on March 25, 1530. Cihualpilli was baptized with the name Juana Bautista. The territory was renamed Nueva Galicia and the town Santiago de Tonalá.

The new province was initially governed by Diego Vázquez Buendía and remained the main settlement in the area until the founding of Guadalajara in 1535. Evangelization was carried out by the Franciscans and the Augustinians until the early 17th century.

In 1824, the Tonalá became one of the twenty six departments of Jalisco, officially named a town, then in the same year became subordinate to Zapotlanejo. Through the rest of the 19th century, its status changed and was unclear, mentioned as a municipality in a decree in 1873 but declared subordinate to Zapotlanejo and San Pedro in 1889.

More than MXN $100 million was transferred to the Center for Multidisciplinary Health Research, University Center of Tonalá (CUTonalá), to detect and prevent COVID-19. 110 people worked in laboratories, 470 attended a call center, and 135 people worked in the Voluntary Isolation Center (CAV) in the Villa Primavera Hotel of the University of Guadalajara. Merchants at the traditional tianguis (outdoor market) reported that their earnings had fallen by 60% due to health safety concerns related to the COVID-19 pandemic in Mexico by December 2020. Tonalá reported 4,357 confirmed cases and 540 deaths from the pandemic as of February 26, 2021.

Eleven people were killed and at least two wounded when unidentified armed assailants attacked a party on February 27, 2021.

== Economy ==
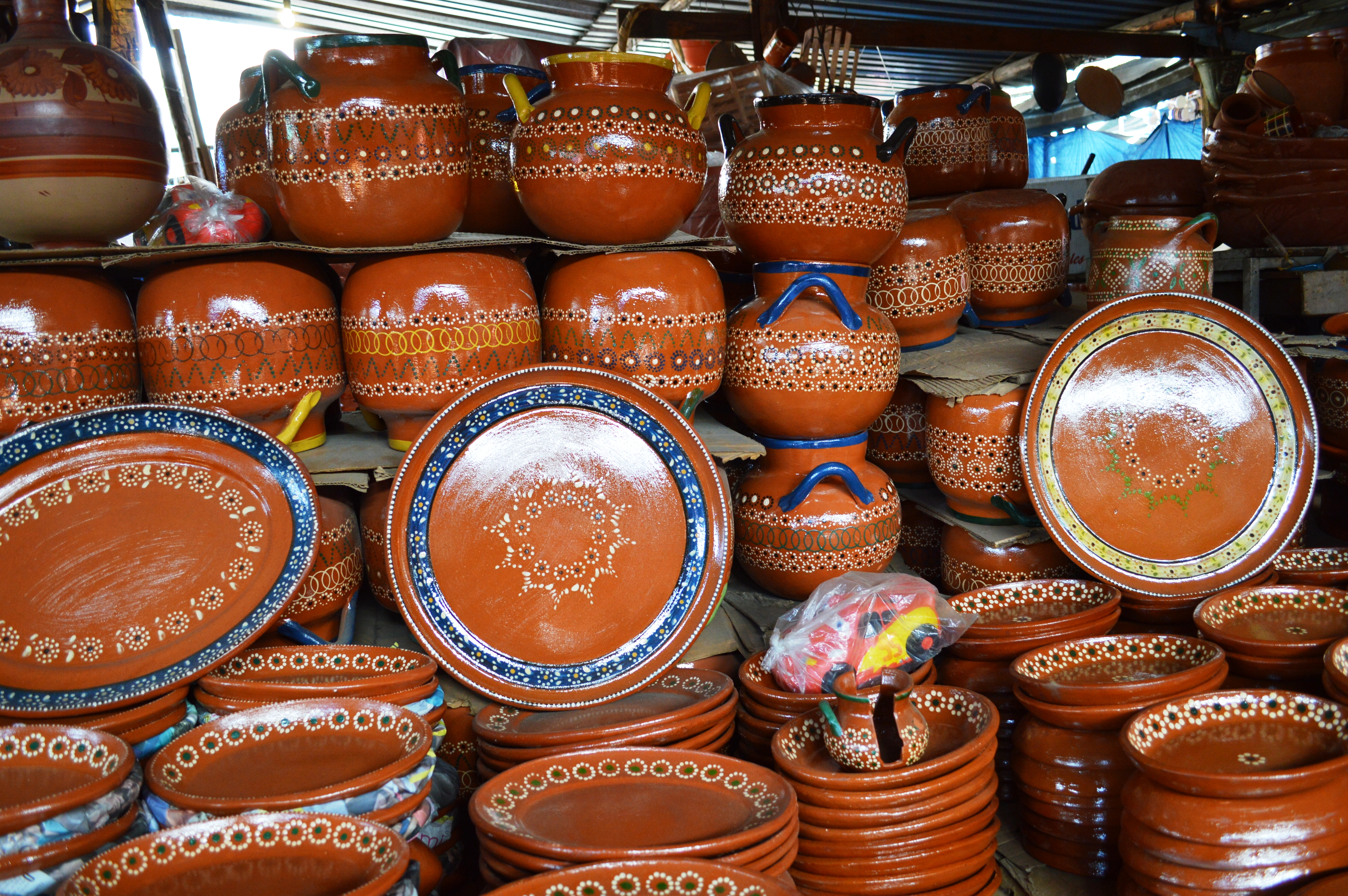
Basic dishes for sale at a stand at the Thursday street market of the city

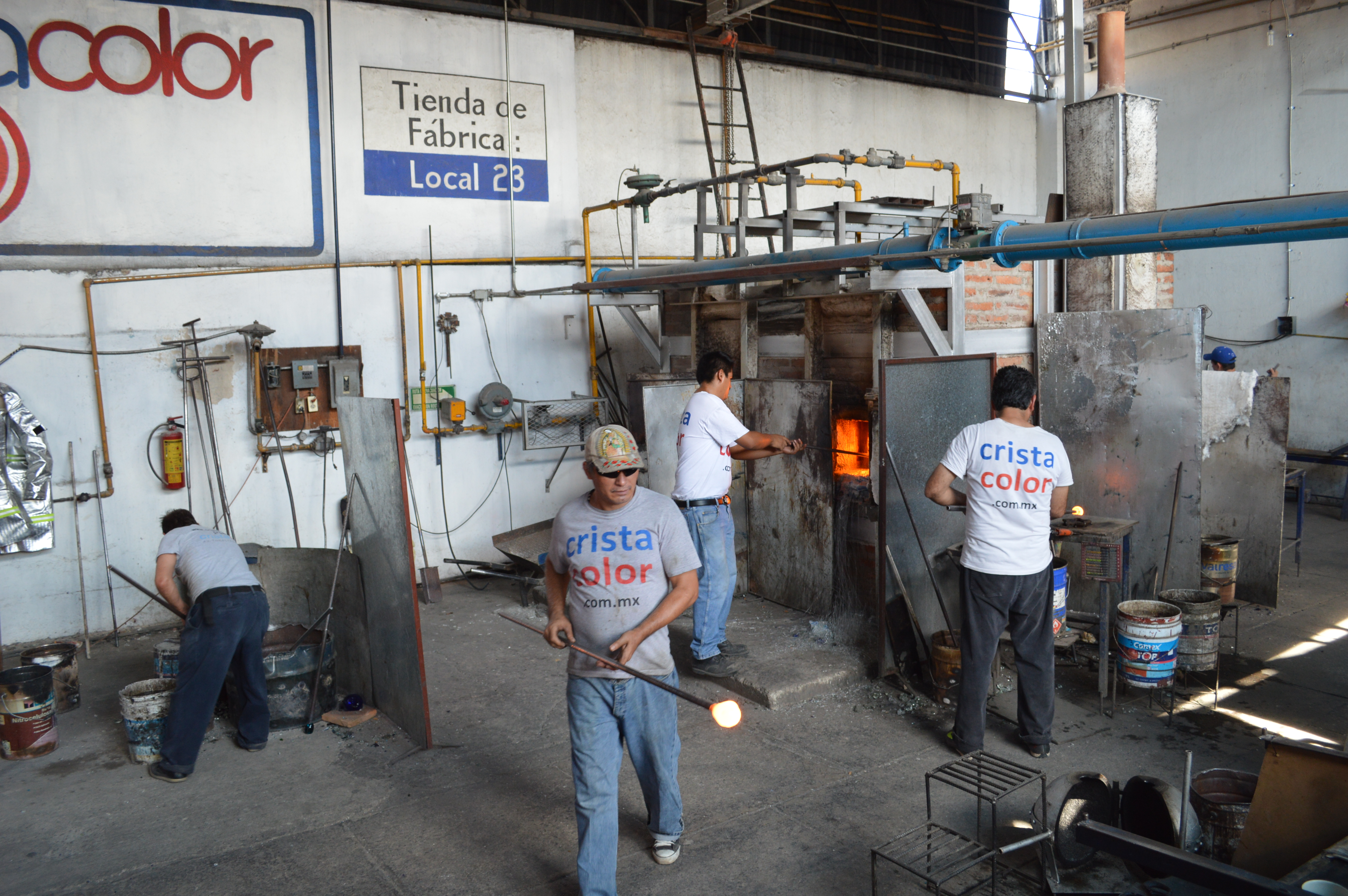
Cristacolor glass blowing workshop in Tonalá

Tonalá is rated as having a very low level of socio-economic marginalization. Overall, the main sources of employment for the municipality include handcrafts, tourism, transportation, commerce and administration. Forty three percent work in commerce and services, 32% in handcrafts and other industries, and 21% in administrative and professional services. Less than one percent work in agriculture.

The most visible economic activity is handcrafts, especially pottery. It is a major center for this activity in Jalisco, along with Tlaquepaque. The town has been a ceramics center since the pre Hispanic period. The variety include traditional Jalisco varieties from the colonial period such as bruñido, petatillo, bandera, canelo, betus and even bruñido with applications of gold leaf. In the 1970s, Ken Edwards and Jorge Wilmot introduced stone ware and high fire ceramics to Tonalá. Ceramic pieces include plates, platters, jars, cantaros, cooking pots, flower pots, flower vases, miniatures and other kinds of decorative pieces. One popular design motif in Tonalá ceramics is called the Flor de Tonalá (Tonalá flower), which is an oval center with rounded petals.

A number of other handcrafted items are made in Tonalá as well, with blown glass coming second after ceramics. Others include ironwork, woodworking, especially furniture, cartonería (animals, clowns and dolls), tin and brass objects.

The handcrafts business means ups and downs for the municipality, depending on the market. For example, many businesses closed and other reduced operations when there are economic recessions in either Mexico or the US as 80% of exports go to the latter country. Another issue is the importation of cheaper and similar Asian products.

Unlike Tlaquepaque, the town of Tonalá has not been geared for tourists in the sense of hotels, restaurant and scenic streets. Despite this, it received thousands of visitors each week, most drawn by the street market or "tianguis" that is set up each Thursday and Sunday. This market is centered on the town main road for about a kilometer, and spills into adjoining side streets. This market can have from between 3,500 and 4,000 vendors, especially during the Christmas and Holy Week holidays when tourism is highest in Mexico.

Aside from handcrafts, commerce is mostly limited to basic needs, with 1,000 small grocery stores, 128 butcher shops, and 142 businesses selling produce. There are also eleven municipal markets and thirty nine other tianguis markets. Agriculture is done on small-scale, raising corn, sorghum, vegetables, dairy cattle, pigs, sheep, goats, domestic fowl and bees. There is also some fish farming and mining for sand, gravel, marble and construction stone.

== Geography ==
The municipality is located in the eastern part of the state. With an average altitude of 1.500 meters above sea level, the territory has three kinds of relief: areas of rugged terrain, semi flat and flat areas. The main elevations are the Cerro Cúpula de la Reina, and Xólotl, both 1,720 meters above sea level.

=== Climate ===
The climate is semi dry with the driest months in the winter and spring. It is semi-warm without a well-defined winter with about six days a year with temperatures at freezing or below. Most of the annual rainfall, 900mm, falls between July and October. Dominant winds are from the east.

=== Hydrography ===
The main river is the Santiago originally called the Cichnahuay, which flows in the west and north of the territory. Tributary streams include the Popul, Las Jicamas and Agua Amarilla, all located in the east of the municipality. There are also dams called La Rusia, De Sermeño and El Ocotillo, with the Colimilla on the Santiago River itself. The Santiago River carves one of the main natural attractions of the municipality, the Colimilla Ravine. The municipal has also been known for thermal springs, said to have curative powers, since the colonial period. The main thermal spring today are those of Agua Caliente.

=== Flora and fauna ===
The municipality contains 420 hectares of forest that contains mostly huizache, mesquite, holm oak and oak. Most of the vegetation is deciduous, with leaves falling during the dry season and scrub plants.

Wildlife is mostly limited to the ravines and include various rodents, skunks, deer, wildcats, armadillos, opossums and various bird species.

== Demographics ==
Ninety seven percent of the population lives in urban areas, with a population density of just over 4,000 people per square km. Population growth from 2005 to 2010 was 3.45%, down from 7.2% the previous five years. As of 2010 only 3,389 people spoke an indigenous language, mostly Nahuatl. Just over 90% of the population is Roman Catholic. Most of the rest are Protestant or profess no religion.

== Education ==
The municipality has 145 pre-schools, 166 primary schools, 41 middle schools, eighteen high/vocational schools, one special education center and two continuing educational centers. About 60 percent of the population has finished primary school and 3,36% are illiterate.

In 2012 the Centro Universitario de Tonalá was opened as part of the Universidad de Guadalajara.

== See also ==
- Ceramics of Jalisco
- Municipalities of Mexico
- Metropolitan areas of Mexico
