= Handcrafts and folk art in Jalisco =

Artwork in the Mexican state of Jalisco

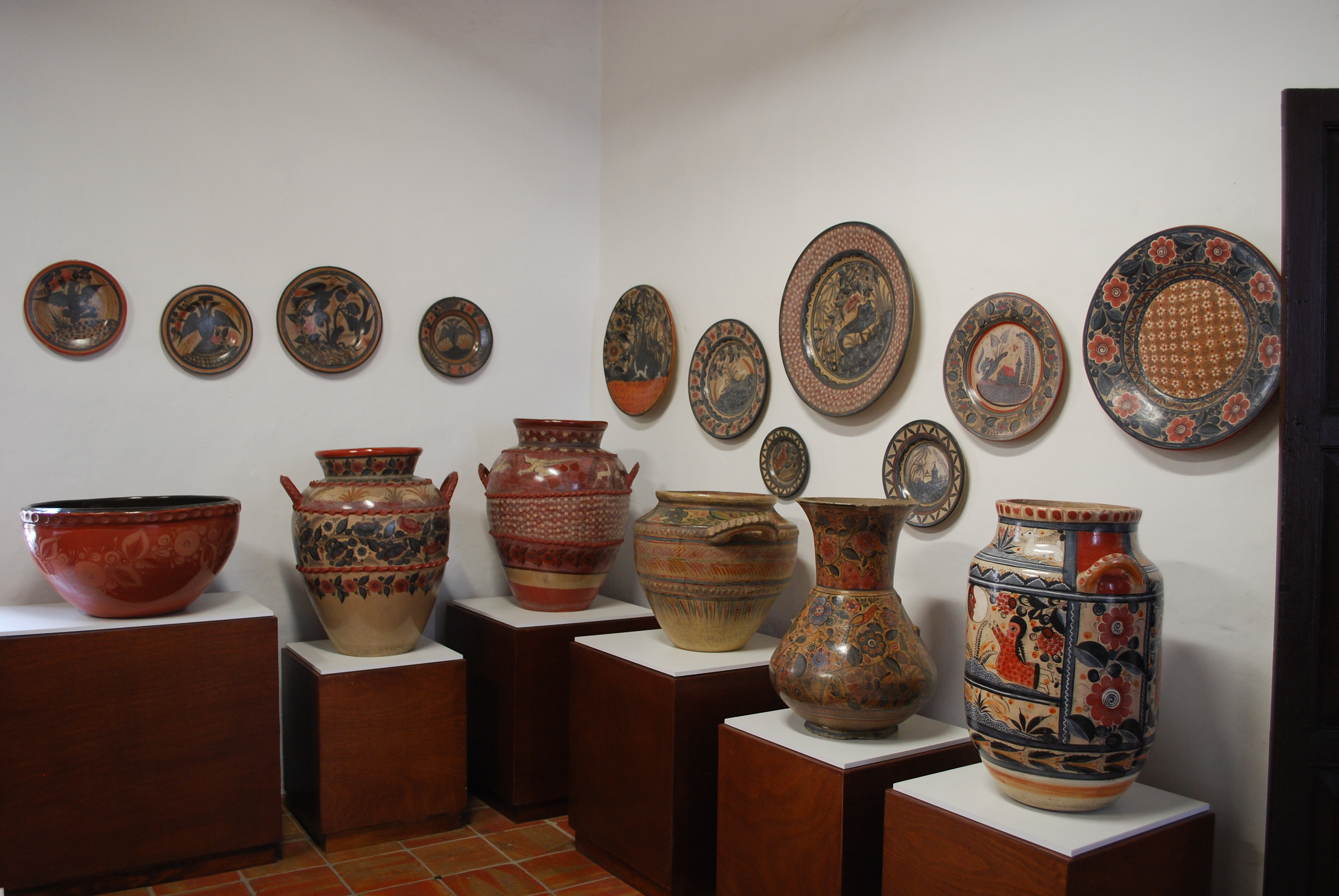
One of the rooms inside the National Ceramics Museum in Tonalá, Jalisco

Jalisco handcrafts and folk art are noted among Mexican handcraft traditions. The state is one of the main producers of handcrafts, which are noted for quality. The main handcraft tradition is ceramics, which has produced a number of known ceramicists, including Jorge Wilmot, who introduced high fire work into the state. In addition to ceramics, the state also makes blown glass, textiles (including serapes), wood furniture including the equipal chair, baskets, metal items, piteado and Huichol art.

== Status ==
Jalisco is one of Mexico's main producers of handcrafts and folk art, along with Michoacán and Oaxaca. It produces a large quantity and wide variety, with a number of traditions noted for their quality. Most of these are made and sold in the area in and around the state capital of Guadalajara, which is the main focus of commerce for western Mexico. In addition, to providing jobs directly, the manufacture and sales of handcrafts is an important component of the state's tourism industry.

The state's oldest craft traditions extend to the pre Hispanic period and many of the traditional designs and forms seen today were developed during the colonial period. However, their modern standing is mostly due to the efforts of Jorge Wilmot, who moved to Tonalá in the 1950s after studying ceramics in Europe and Asia. Here and in neighboring Tlaquepaque, he introduced modern ceramic techniques, especially high-fire stoneware. He expanded the area's production from pots and jars to complete dish sets, large vases, mosaics and tiles and more. For his work, Wilmot was awarded Mexico National Prize in Arts and Sciences in 1997.

Wilmot's efforts were followed up by state government efforts to preserve and promote Jalisco craft traditions. Tlaquepaque is home to the Regional Museum for Ceramics, founded in 1964 by the Patronato de Artes e Industrias Populares (Board for Folk Arts and Industries) under then governor Agustín Yañez. The museum exhibits the best examples of the state's ceramics. In 1965, Jalisco was one of the first states to organize a state institution, the Instituto de Artesanía Jaliscence, to do research into handcrafts, organize its craftsmen and market state goods. The institution began as the Casa de las Artesanías, built in the 1960s, along with a number of other public works projects.

About 75,000 artisans are active with the Instituto Jaliscense de Artesanias. However, about half of these are over age sixty and those under thirty are declining these vocations. The main reason for this is economic, as most artisans made subsistence wages, lower than most other occupations. In addition, Jalisco handcrafts face competition from imported imitations, primarily from Asia. One area which is particularly susceptible is the market for nativity scenes, and religious figures.

The state looks to preserve crafts, registering artisans for research purposes as well as for grants and other assistance, especially to younger artisans. This assistance include primary materials, equipment, training and marketing. The state sponsors events such as "Jalisco es Artesania" (Jalisco is Handcrafts) to promote the crafts produced in sixty municipalities in all of the state's regions, as part of efforts to improve the economy of rural areas in particular.

== Handcraft traditions ==
=== Ceramics ===
Jalisco's most important handcraft is ceramics, which has a national reputation. It produces a wide variety of pieces both decorative and utilitarian including tiles, bathroom fixtures, vases, dishes, storage containers, bottles, jars, platters, figurines, pots and vats. Most of the state's production is in the Atemajac Valley, especially the towns of Tlaquepaque and Tonalá, which produce some of the most distinctive pottery techniques and decorative styles in the country.

The most traditional of this pottery dates from the colonial period. Bandera is named for the red and white, sometimes with green painted decorative motifs, the colors of the Mexican flag. It is a speciality of Tonalá. Canelo is named for its cinnamon color. It is porous and often used for water jugs as it keeps liquids cool. Betus is a glazed, double-fired ware, characterized by the use of "betus" oil, derived from pine resin. Its production is mostly based in Tonalá and Santa Cruz de las Huertas. It is mostly used for making figurines of both animals and humans. Bruñido, also a speciality of Tonalá, is one of the state's oldest techniques, named after the burnishing done for its shine rather than glazing. It is made with a mix of black and white clays and often painted with images of deer and flowers. Related to this is petatillo, which is burnished pottery distinguished by the use of fine cross hatching in areas not painted with images, commonly animals and plants. Two other traditional pottery styles include "de lumber," a simple pottery used for making cooking pots and such and "de matiz," which is a creamy what with decorations painted in black, red or green, often used to make figures from Mexico's history.

More recent additions to Jalisco's current pottery production include maiolica style pottery, often black, white or green, with little or no decoration along with high-fire pieces such as kaolin and stoneware. This advanced pottery was introduced in the mid 20th century and is principally produced in Tlaquepaque and Tonalá.

The state's long history of fine pottery production has resulted in a number of highly notable ceramicists. The Pablo Jimón family is noted for bruñido work, especially jars and "pomegranate" pieces. Amado Galvan makes bruñido jars, animal figures, and large vats.

=== Wood ===
Wood is worked in varied communities to make a variety of wares, which include furniture, toys and cooking utensils. The most common item is furniture of various types. The best known furniture piece produced in the state is the equipal chair, which are round made with strips of wood and backs and seats of leather. This chair has become common in Mexican restaurants in Mexico and the United States, as well as popular for gardens and terraces. The main center for their production is Zocoalco de Torres, where numerous families make them. They were originally ceremonial chairs, reserved for priests and the upper classes. The wood is from a tree called the palo dulce, with sections sliced with a curved machete and arranged to form the base and supports. The seat and sometimes other parts of the chair are made or covered with leather. These are usually placed around a round table. Another producer is Jalostoltitlán, noted for its marquetry work to make furniture and lamps of high quality. However, production has diminished since it depends on sabina wood, which has become scarce.

Teocaltiche is known for the production of small wood items, especially lathe-turned pieces, including miniatures, toys, and cooking utensils, especially molinillos, a beater used to make froth in hot chocolate.

=== Textiles ===
Textiles are mostly done in cotton. Embroidered and drawn-work pieces can be found in various parts of the state, including Lagos, San Juan de los Lagos and Encarnación de Díaz. Although the most common kind of Mexican serape is associated with the city of Saltillo, Coahuila, the state of Jalisco has laid claim as the originator, with several variations. Encarnación de Díaz has claimed to be the originator of the "Saltillo" serape, more so Teocaltiche, which claims it has been made there since the 18th century and has sought denominación de origen. In reality, genuine versions of this sarape are difficult to fine as it requires fine raw material and a delicate weaving technique. Other serapes styles made in the state include a wool one made in Ajijic, those made in Jocotepec and a style called jorongo in Talpa. Other handcrafted clothing items include rebozos in silk, sashes, shirts and aprons called chincuetes or tilmas, especially in Tlaquepaque, Tonalá, Lagos de Moreno, Tuxpan and along the shore of Lake Chapala. The Huichols in the north of the state are noted for their embroidery.

=== Others ===
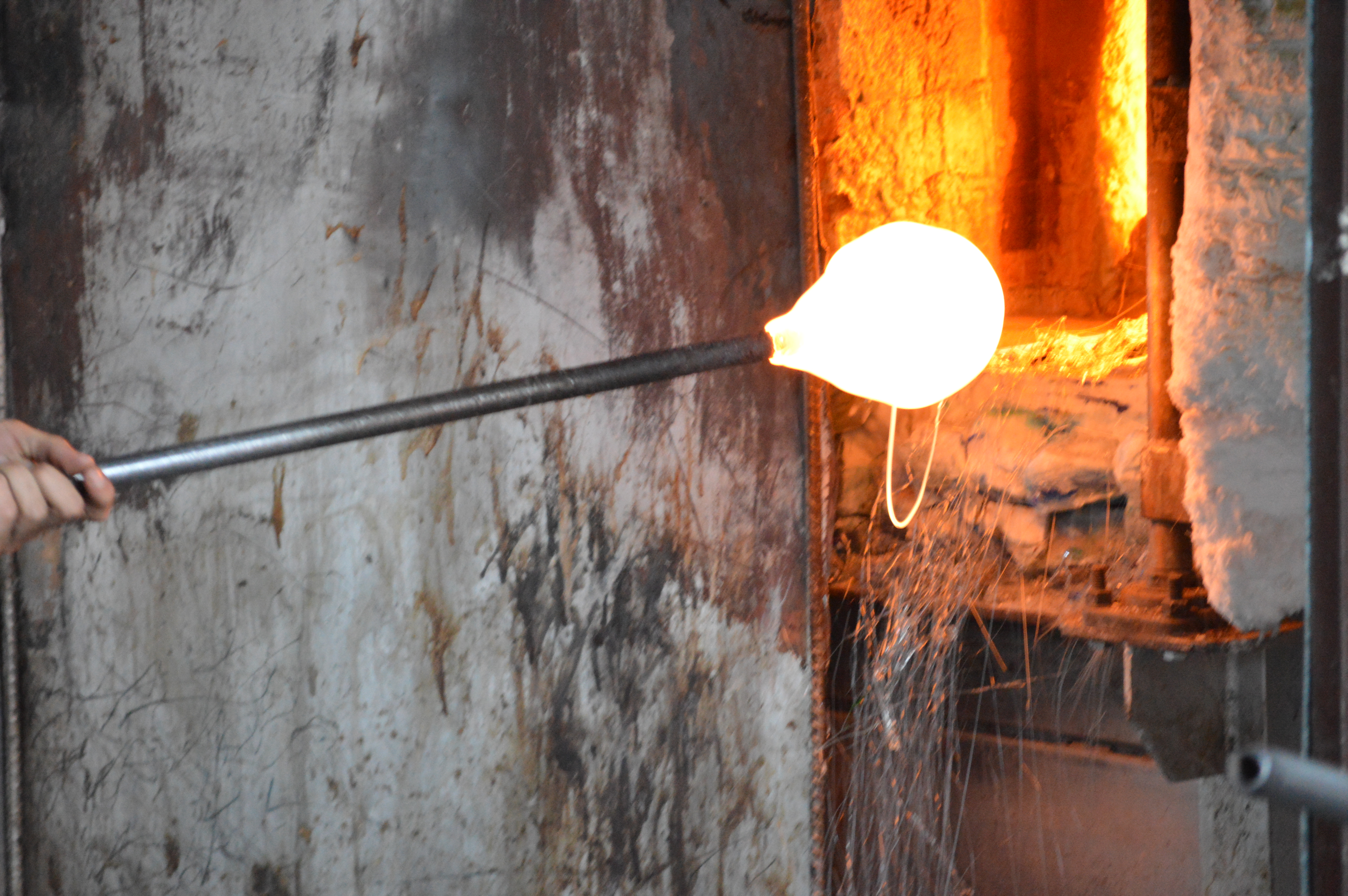
Glass being heated for blowing at Cristacolor in Tonalá

Blown glass has been an important industry in the state since the early 20th century, especially in Tonalá and Tlaquepaque. Initially, it was developed to make bottles for the tequila industry. Since then, it has developed into the making of various utilitarian and decorative objects, using a variety of techniques. Traditional colors for glass pieces include cobalt blue, amethyst and green. Blown glass remains true to traditional forms as well as division of labor, with workshops having apprentices and workers under a master craftsman. However more modern setups have come into play since the mid 20th century, when Jose Camarasa began to manufacture glass prisms for light fixtures and lamps in Tlaquepaque. He also makes ornamental and utilitarian pieces of lead crystal, with the red pieces particularly prized.

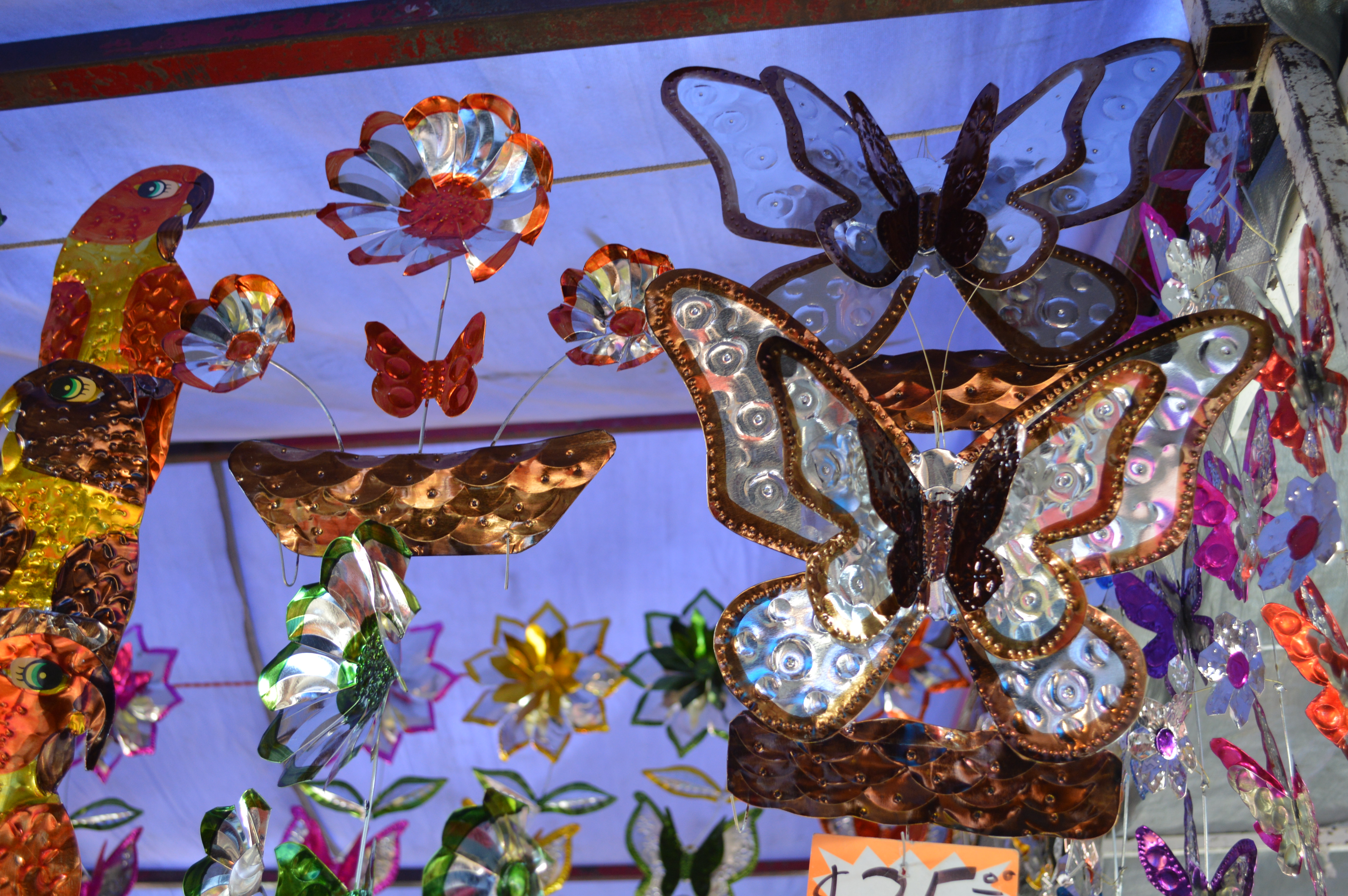
Tin items in Tonalá

Metals include iron, gold, tin, copper, and silver to make fine and everyday objects. Tin is worked from sheets to make decorative objects such as mirror frames and Christmas decorations. Wrought iron is principally worked in Guadalajara, and in Sayuda where they make knives, blades and machetes and is home to the Knife Museum. Silver is worked into jewelry (earrings, necklaces, bracelets, rings, etc.) in Guadalajara, which is one of Mexico's main centers for this work. Pewter is worked into bowls, plates, frames and more.

Part of the Huichol region lies in Jalisco, and crafts associated with this ethnic group are found in the state. Originally, they were votive in nature but a number of techniques have been adapted to making of commercial items. These include yarn paintings and the making of god's eyes, as well as pieces decorated with fine beads. These commercial pieces range from those with traditional imagery to those incorporating more modern motifs. Bolaños sponsored the creation of a seven-meter deer sculpture inlaid with beads in the Huichol style.

As Jalisco is noted for charros, the working of leather and a decorative technique called piteado are important. Leather is produced from cattle, sheep skin and formed into belts, boots, huaraches (especially in Concepción de Buenos Aires), other shoes, bags, whips, chaps, saddles and more. Many of these pieces decorated with piteado, a kind of embroidery using tough ixtle fiber. The town of Colotlán is particularly noted for its piteado.

Stonework is principally done in pink sandstone (cantera) in the Los Altos region. In this region, many of the public buildings such as churches have decorative elements such as columns, fountains and more done in this stone. It is also used to make tables, other furniture pieces, religious figures and more.

Basketry is still done in the Lake Chalapa region, where the lake is still a source of reeds and rushes. Other materials used include willow branches and palm fronds to make baskets, mats, hats, rope and more. Towns noted for this work include Jocotepec, Encarnación de Díaz, Usmajac Gomez Farias, Zapotitlan, Tocolotlan, Cuquio, Zapotlan, Barra de Navidad and San Miguel Cyutlan.

Masks are made in various parts of the state and in various materials, traditionally connected with ceremonial dances such as the mecos or Apaches in Los Altos, tastoanes in Santa Cruz de la Huertas (Tonala), diablos in Cajititlan, aguila real in Zapopan, tatachines in the north of the state and paixtles in Zapotlan el Grande and Tuxpan.

Other handcrafts include cartonería (piñatas, masks and decorative items) made various locations, toys made in Santa Ana Acatlán, miniatures made in Tlaquepaque and Items made of corn husk made in Acatlán de Juárez.

== Handcraft centers ==
Most of the state's handcrafts are produced in the Atemajac Valley, in and around the state capital. These includeTlaquepaque, Tonalá, Tateposco, San Antonio de las Huertas, El Rosario and Santa Cruz. Each has its own specialties and designs. The two main production centers are Tlaquepaque and Tonalá which make various types of low and high-fire pottery, aluminum goods, clothing, leather, metals such as tin, iron, bronze and copper, stone, wicker, wood, cartonería, fireworks, blown glass, carved glass and gypsum. The main tradition is pottery, both glazed and unglazed, including sculpted figures which include those for nativity scenes, those of public figures such as Mexican presidents. One family particularly noted for figures is the Panduro family, which has done this for a number of generations. Not only do these towns produce, they are also the main outlets for handcrafts for the entire state, especially the finer wares. Tonalá is home to the National Ceramics Museum, which was established by Jorge Wilmot.

Silver jewelry is mostly made in Guadalajara, which is one of the most important centers for this kind of work.

Outside of this area, the town of Sayula specializes in maiolica ceramics, a tradition which has been revived. The town of Talpa is home to a very local tradition of make religious images and ornamental pieces such as flowers baskets and flowers with a local gum substance called "chicle." While colorful, they degrade quickly. Most are bought each year in connection with a feast of the Virgin Mary celebrated in the town.

== Notable artisans ==
- Jorge Wilmot
- Ángel Santos Juárez
- Jesús José Berabe Campechano
- Zenón Martínez García
- Salvador Vázquez Carmona
- Florentino Jimón Barba
- Nicasio Pajarito Gonzalez
- Jesús Carranza Cortés
- Aguirre family
- Agustín Parra Echauri
