= Zenon (given name) =

Zenon, Zénon is a masculine given name that may refer to the following notable people:

- Zenon of Kaunos, public official in Egypt around the 250s–230s BC
- Zenon (footballer) (born 1954), Brazilian footballer
- Zenon Andrusyshyn (1947–2023), German-born Canadian football player
- Zénon Bacq (1903–1983), Belgian radiobiologist and inventor
- Zenon Baranowski (1930–1980), Polish sprinter
- Zenon Begier (1935–2019), Polish discus thrower
- Zénon Bernard (1893–1942), Luxembourgish communist politician
- Zenon Borevich (1922–1995), Russian mathematician
- Zenon Bortkevich (1937–2010), Azerbaijani water polo player
- Zenon Burzawa (born 1961), Polish football manager and former player
- Zenon Caravella (born 1983), Australian footballer
- Zenon Czechowski (1946–2016), Polish cyclist
- Zenón Díaz (1880–1948), Argentine footballer
- Zenon Friedwald (1906–1976), Polish Israeli writer and artist
- Zenon Grocholewski (1939–2020), Polish cardinal
- Zenon C.R. Hansen (1909–1990), American businessman
- Zenon Jankowski (born 1937), Polish pilot and cosmonaut
- Zenon Jaskuła (born 1962), Polish cyclist
- Zenon Kasprzak (born 1962), Polish speedway rider
- Zenon Kasztelan (born 1946), Polish football player
- Zenon Kazimierz Wysłouch (1727–1805), Polish nobleman
- Zenon Klemensiewicz (1891–1969), Polish linguist
- Zenon Kliszko (1908–1989), Polish politician
- Zenon Kohut (born 1944), Canadian historian
- Zenon Konopka (born 1981), Canadian/Polish hockey player
- Zenon Kulpa (born 1946), Polish computer scientist
- Zenon Kuzelia (1882–1952), Ukrainian linguist, bibliographer, historian and journalist
- Zenon Labauve Jr. (1801–1870), American Reconstruction-era justice of the Louisiana Supreme Court
- Zénon Lesage (1885–1956), Canadian politician
- Zenon Licznerski (born 1954), Polish sprinter
- Zenon B. Lukosius (1918–2006), American World War II veteran
- Zenon Mariak, Polish neurosurgeon
- Zenon Martyniuk (born 1969), Polish singer and guitarist
- Zenón Martínez García (died 2010), Mexican potter
- Zenon Mazurkevich (1939–2018), Ukrainian-American architect
- Zenon Mikhailidis, Greek shooter
- Zenon Mróz (born 1930), Polish engineer
- Zenón Noriega Agüero (1900–1957), Peruvian army general
- Zenon Nowak (1905–1980), Polish Communist activist and politician
- Zenon Nowosz (born 1944), Polish sprinter
- Zenon Piątkowski (1902–1967), Polish sports shooter
- Zenon Pigoń (1940–2023), Polish trade unionist and politician
- Zenon Plech (1953–2020), Polish motorcycle speedway rider
- Zenon Przesmycki (1861–1944), Polish poet and translator
- Zenon Pylyshyn (1937–2022), Canadian cognitive scientist
- Zenón Rolón (1856–1902), Argentine musician
- Zenon Różycki (1913–1992), Polish basketball player
- Zenon Snylyk (1933–2002), Ukrainian-American association football player
- Zenon Sroczyński (1909–1984), Polish football player
- Zenon Świętosławski (1811–1875), Polish emigre and socialist utopian
- Zenon Szordykowski (born 1947), Polish middle-distance runner
- Zénon Trudeau (1748–1813), French colonial administrator
- Zenon Trzonkowski (1957–2021), Polish football defender, coach and manager
- Zenon Waraszkiewicz (1909–1946), Polish mathematician
- Zenon Ważny (1929–2017), Polish pole vaulter
- Zenon Wiśniewski (born 1959), Polish politician

== See also ==
- Zenonas
- Zenons
