= Abicht =

Abicht is a German surname derived from "Albrecht". Notable people with the surname include:

- Adolf Abicht (1793–1860), Polish-Lithuanian physician
- Albert Abicht (1893–1973), German farmer and politician
- Henryk Abicht (1835–1863), Polish independence activist
- Johann Georg Abicht (1672–1740), German theologian
- Johann Heinrich Abicht (1762–1816), German philosopher

== See also ==
- Abich
