= Ceramics of Jalisco =

Type of Mexican ceramics

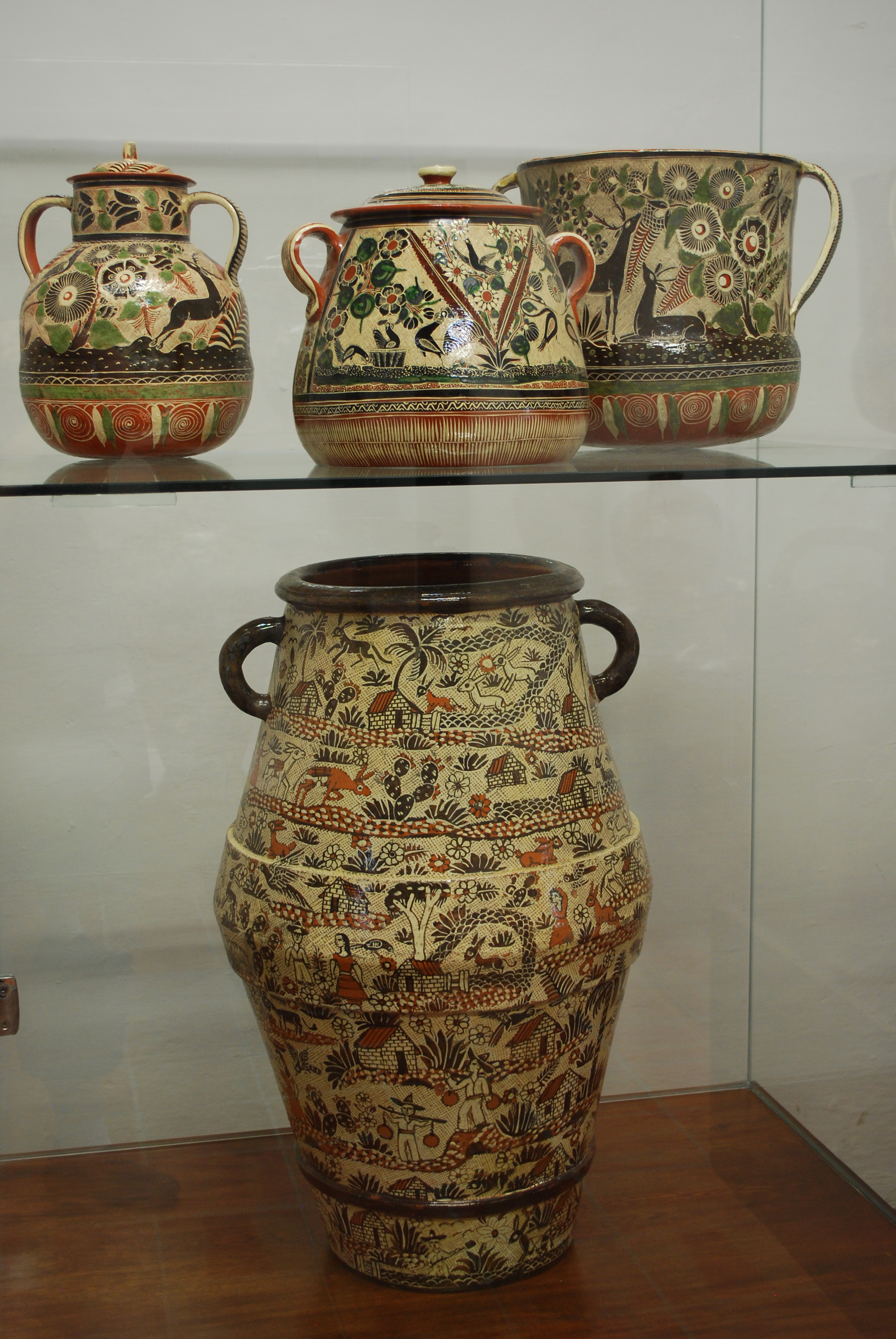
High fire ceramic with traditional designs at the Museo Regional de la Ceramica, Tlaquepaque.

Ceramics of Jalisco, Mexico has a history that extends far back in the pre Hispanic period, but modern production is the result of techniques introduced by the Spanish during the colonial period and the introduction of high-fire production in the 1950s and 1960s by Jorge Wilmot and Ken Edwards. Today various types of traditional ceramics such as bruñido, canelo and petatillo are still made, along with high fire types like stoneware, with traditional and nontraditional decorative motifs. The two main ceramics centers are Tlaquepaque and Tonalá, with a wide variety of products such as cookware, plates, bowls, piggy banks and many types of figures.

== History ==
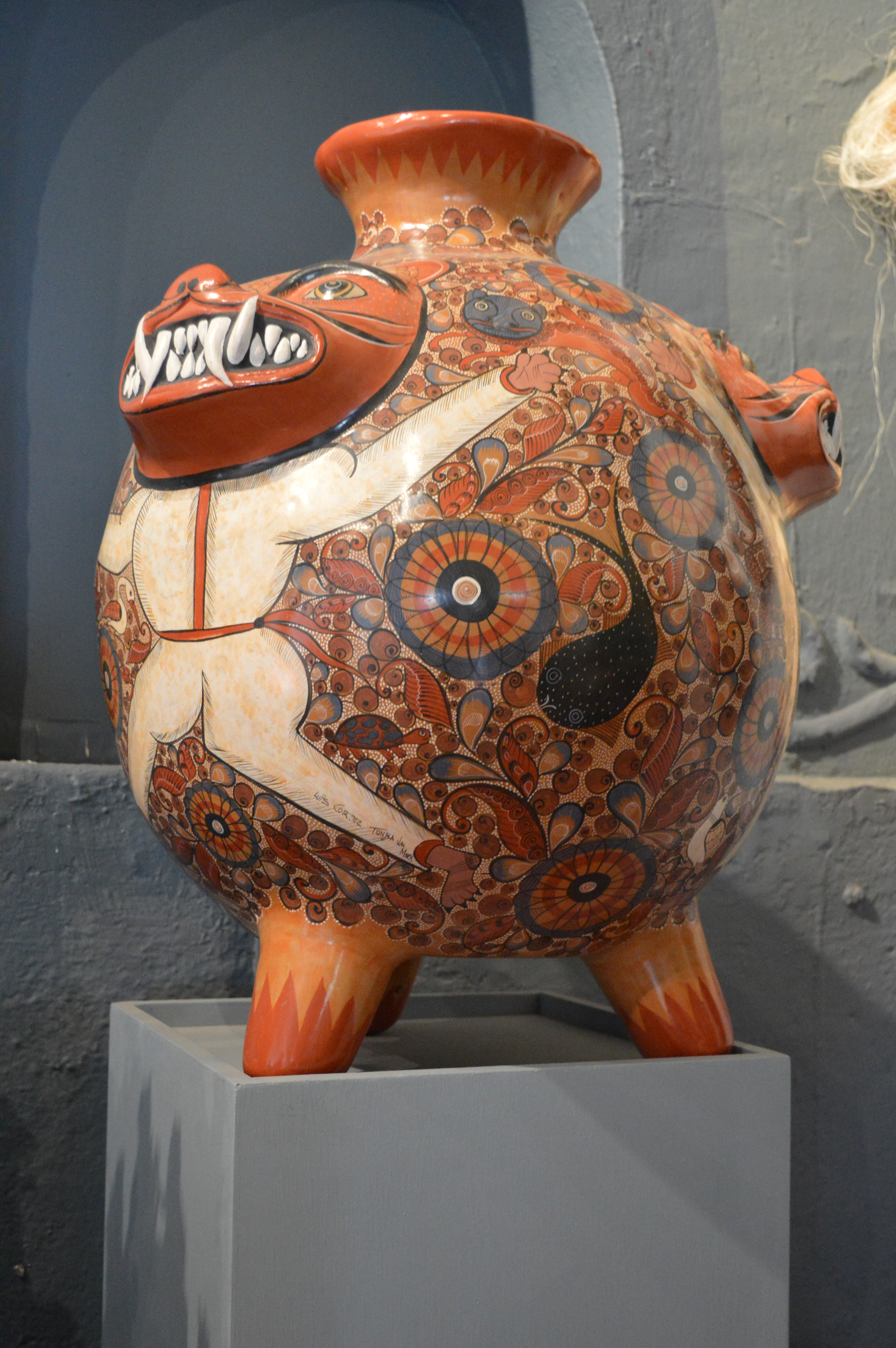
Large ceramic container at the Museo Nacional de la Cerámica in Tonalá, Jalisco

The making of ceramics in Jalisco extends far back into the pre Hispanic era. Early ceramics in the area were rough and utilitarian, for such purposes as cooking, carrying water or storing seeds. Some of these were multicolored, but the decorated faded because the pieces were not fired after painting.

The Spanish introduced European techniques to the area, especially the potter's wheel to make more symmetrical containers and glazing to keep color and give a bright finish. Spanish introduced ceramics were slowly adopted by the indigenous population in most of New Spain but in Jalisco, their adoption was relatively quick. Demand was high, spurring a developed ceramics industry in the Guadalajara area. The ceramics industry was established by monks who not only evangelized the indigenous, they also taught them trades, such as European style pottery. The training allowed for indigenous traditions, such as burnishing to be combined with the use of high quality clay slips. It also allowed for a decorating styles influenced by European, indigenous and Oriental motifs. The Tonalá tradition became known as "Tonalá ware" "Polished ornamental ware" or "Guadalajara polychrome." A number of these pieces were exported Europe in the 17th and 18th centuries, mostly to Spain but examples reached Italy and other areas. However, in the later colonial period ceramics waned in Tlaquepaque, coming back in the 19th century with jars and Nativity scenes. One item which seems luxurious today, but was probably relatively ordinary in colonial period was large ceramic bathtubs, which were richly decorated inside and out with images such as Saint James on horseback, the patron saint of the locality, double headed eagles and other motif surrounded by vegetative images, flowers, thick and thin lines and more.

In the 1950s and 1960s, Jorge Wilmot and Ken Edwards introduced more modern high-fire ceramics to the Guadalajara area, starting in Tonalá. These are wares fired at over 1000C which vitrifies the clay and eliminates the need for lead-based glazes. Wilmot mostly kept local traditional designs although some Oriental influence is mixed in as well, along with Asian glazing processes. Edwards introduced new designs with the techniques.

Today, Jalisco's ceramics stand out for their variety, unique decoration and various style noted for their quality, well known nationally and internationally. Jalisco has a particularly strong ceramics tradition in Mexico, not only for its variety but as part of the culture. Barro bruñido is recognized as part of the state and international as distinctively Mexican. Starting in the 1990s, the wholesale market for ceramics waned because of the overvalued peso and markets opening to cheaper Asian ceramics, especially from China. The economic changes of the past decades have put pressure on Jalisco's ceramic industry as it competes with Asian imports. To help Jalisco potters stay competitive, the Museo Regional de la Cerámica has added a design center to help train local artisans in new designs and techniques.

Most workshops and other producers in the state are still small, with only a few formal enough to undertake export. Most artisans in the state are part of the "informal economy" without formal government registration, making census of the industry difficult. However, it is estimated that handcrafts in general, which ceramics is the most important, generates about 80,000 jobs in the state. Some artisans have moved into specialty markets such as Artesanias Erandi, selling lead-free, hand painted glazed ceramics, popular with US buyers for its rustic and ethnic look. It is high fire but maintains traditional designs.

== Traditional ceramic styles ==
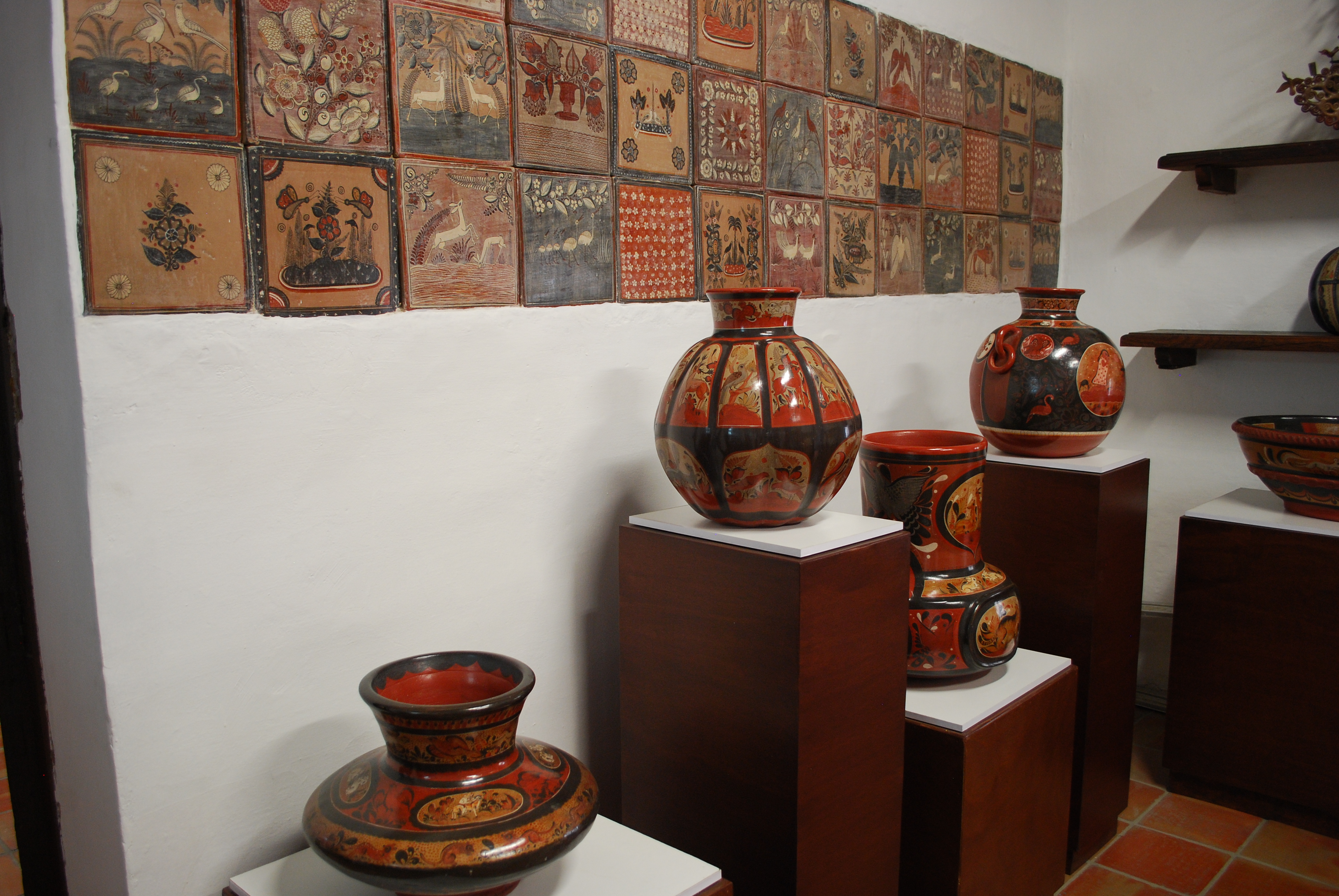
Jars and tiles on display at the Museo Regional de la Cerámica

A wide variety of traditional low-fire and some high fire ceramics are made in Jalisco, ranging from cheap objects to artistic productions. The two main pottery producing municipalities are Tonalá and Tlaquepaque. Traditional ceramics styles include "bruñido", "bandera", "canelo", "petate" and "betus". The best known of these styles is bruñido, which translates to burnished. It probably descends from polychrome produced in this area en the 19th century. The name comes from the fact that these pieces are not glazed, but rather they are given a slip and then polished with a stone or pyrite. Many of these pieces are slender necked jugs or lamp bases, often decorated with animals, such as rabbits, with distorted characteristics, giving them a surreal look. The pieces are usually painted with delicate tones of rose, gray-blue and white on a background of a light coffee color, light gray and sometimes green or blue. Each piece is individually created. The attraction of this pottery is its appearance, as it is too porous to hold any liquid or food. One exception to this are thick large tubs mainly to store water or for bathing. Water stored in this kind of vessel takes on a flavor from the clay, which is actually desired by many people. Another exception is a water container with a fat body and long neck, with a ceramic cup placed upside down over the neck. These are called botellones or carafes. One town that specializes in these is El Rosario, near Tonalá. One variant of bruñido is black, which is often made into jars, flower vases, platters and skulls for Day of the Dead .

Canelo is a type of bruñido is named for the color the fired clay turns out, which is various shades of cinnamon (canela in Spanish). It is burnished with lard and painted with ochre and brown tones. The decorative lines are generally horizontal with different thicknesses and tone with other stylized objects such as leaves, waves and more added. It is popular and used mainly for water jugs because it is good for keeping liquid cool. It is also used to make cooking pots and dry storage containers.

Bandera, which means "flag" in Spanish, is so named because it has the green-red-and-white colors of the Mexican flag. Like, bruñido, it is also an unglazed burnished ware. For unknown reasons, this style of pottery is very rare. The base of this pottery is a red burnished slip which serves as a background for floral decorated painted on. The designs are outlined by a green derived from copper and then filled in with a kaolin white. It is not a common type of pottery but most of what is produced is of high quality, often in Roman style storage jars and water storage containers with a long neck.

Petate or petalillo pottery is distinguished by having a light yellow background filled with crosshatching, which looks like a woven palm mat, called a petate. According to José Bernabé, barro petate began when two potters by the name of Magdaleno Goldívar and José Cervantes began to fill the background with a fine crosshatching. The Bernabé family started experimenting with this decorative style around 1840. The decorative style require very fine white clay in order to create a very smooth painting surface. The main design over the crosshatching is usually painted in black and occasionally in green. These include images of plants and animals, especially deer, rabbits, eagles, roosters and swans. The tighter the crosshatching is, the finer the piece. This type of pottery is used to make mugs for hot chocolate, platters, large bowls and some animal and human figures. This ware is painted before firing at 900C for five or six hours, glazed, and then fired again. The resulting ceramic resists temperatures of up to 3000C. The work involved in the decoration makes this one of the more expensive types of Mexican ceramic, and for this reason, it is most commonly seen on large, relatively flat platters. A giant urn in this style can take up to three years to complete. The two most famous masters of this type of pottery were Pedro Chávez and José Bernabé, but their families continue to make it.

Betus pottery is characterized by vibrant colors that give the ceramics a whimsical look. This style derives its name from the betus oil the clayware is immersed in before it is fired. The oil, which is made of a resin extracted from pine trees, gives the painted pottery a brilliant sheen.

One uncommon ware is called engregado. These objects have a special varnish that make them useful for cooking, the varnish acting like a coating of Teflon that prevents food from slicking when heated.

== High fire ==
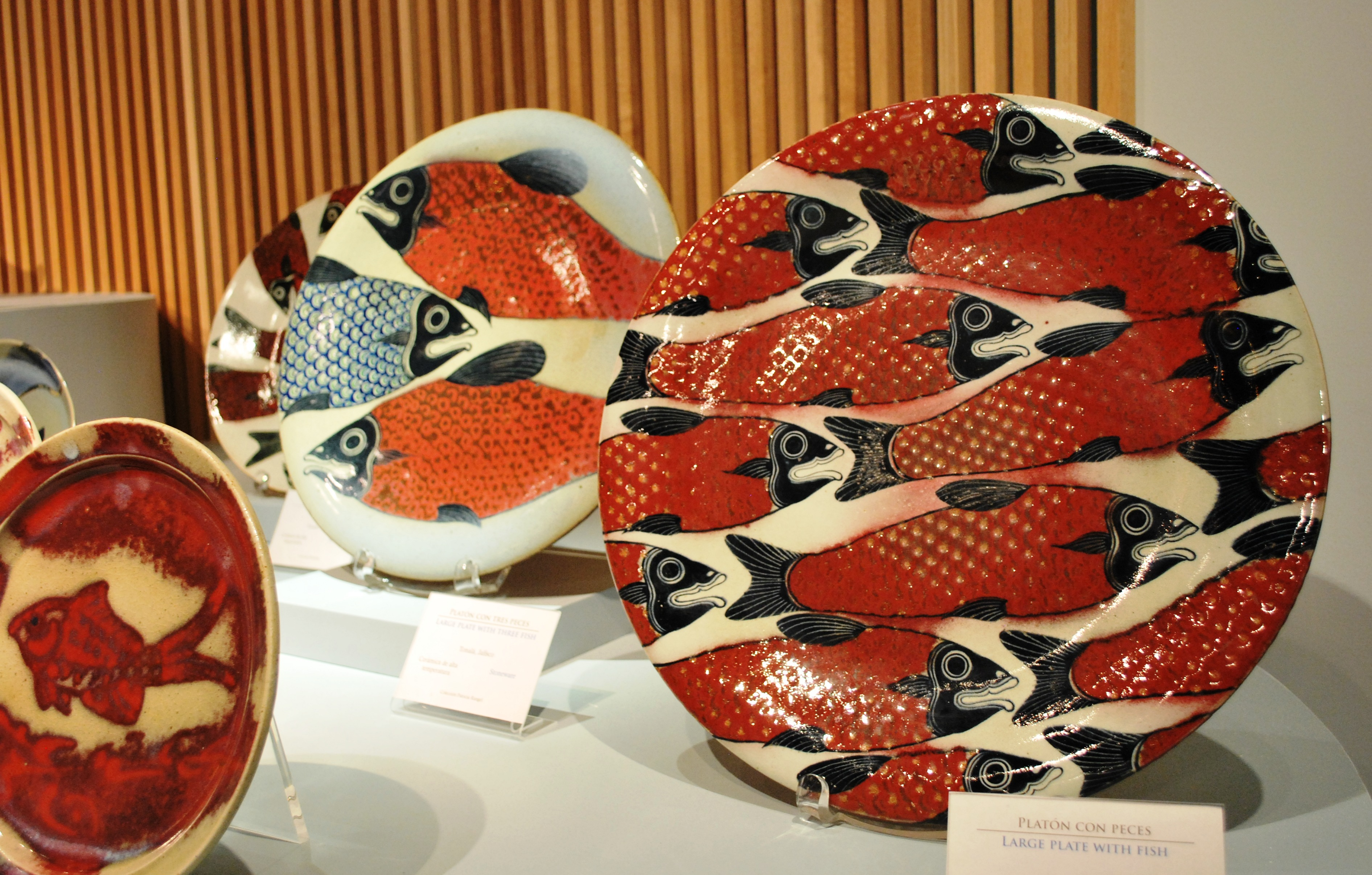
Stoneware plates on display at the Jorge Wilmot exhibition at the Museo de Arte Popular, Mexico City.

Jalisco's high-fire ware is of the best produced in the country. High fire ceramics, including stoneware, were introduced to Jalisco by Jorge Wilmot and Ken Edwards in 1950s and 1960s, making Tonalá the first and primary production of this type of ceramic in Mexico. This production is considered between industrial and traditional handcrafted ceramic. These are fired at over 1,100 °C, causing the clay to vitrify and form a nonporous surface. The main difference between the Wilmot and Edwards styles is that Wilmot maintained the area's traditional decorative styles, focusing on images of suns, birds, eagles, lions and flowers. He also founded a new school of ceramic production which remains to this day, using a traditional green-gray background with images made of small dots, often of double headed eagles, lions and multicolored suns. Edwards' ceramics have a blue-gray background and delicate decorations with Oriental influence. Workshops from both traditions create elaborate bowls, jars, flower vases, and decorative pieces such as fish figures from miniatures to those measuring fifty centimeters.

Wilmot created the Premio Nacional de la Cerámica in 1977 with two categories, traditional and contemporary ceramics. In the last twenty years, new categories have been added. In 1997, a museum dedicated to prize winners was inaugurated as the Museo del Premio Nacional de la Cerámica Pantaleón Panduro, named after a famous artisan. The museum not only displays winning pieces, it also shows the success that Jalisco potters have had in Europe and other places in the world.

Major high fire ceramics workshops today include Netzi, whose bowls has a gray enamel in the inside, with the exteriors finished with a textured yellow, similar to cork, earning it the name of "corcho." The workshop of Noé Suro makes decorative spheres in cobalt blue in a modern style. Stoneware is produced by El Palomar and some other factories in Tlaquepaque. Another high-fire ware is of the white kaolin type by factories such as Loza Fina and Cerámica Contemporánea Suro. The last is a family run operation that caters to chefs, designers, architects, and artists. The workshop primarily make dishes in all shapes and sizes, but items such as lamps and decorative pieces as well. The pieces are generally made to order based on designs preapproved by the client. Orders range in size for a setting for four to the entire dish set for restaurants. Many of their clients buy wares in bulk although there is no minimum.

== Tonalá ==
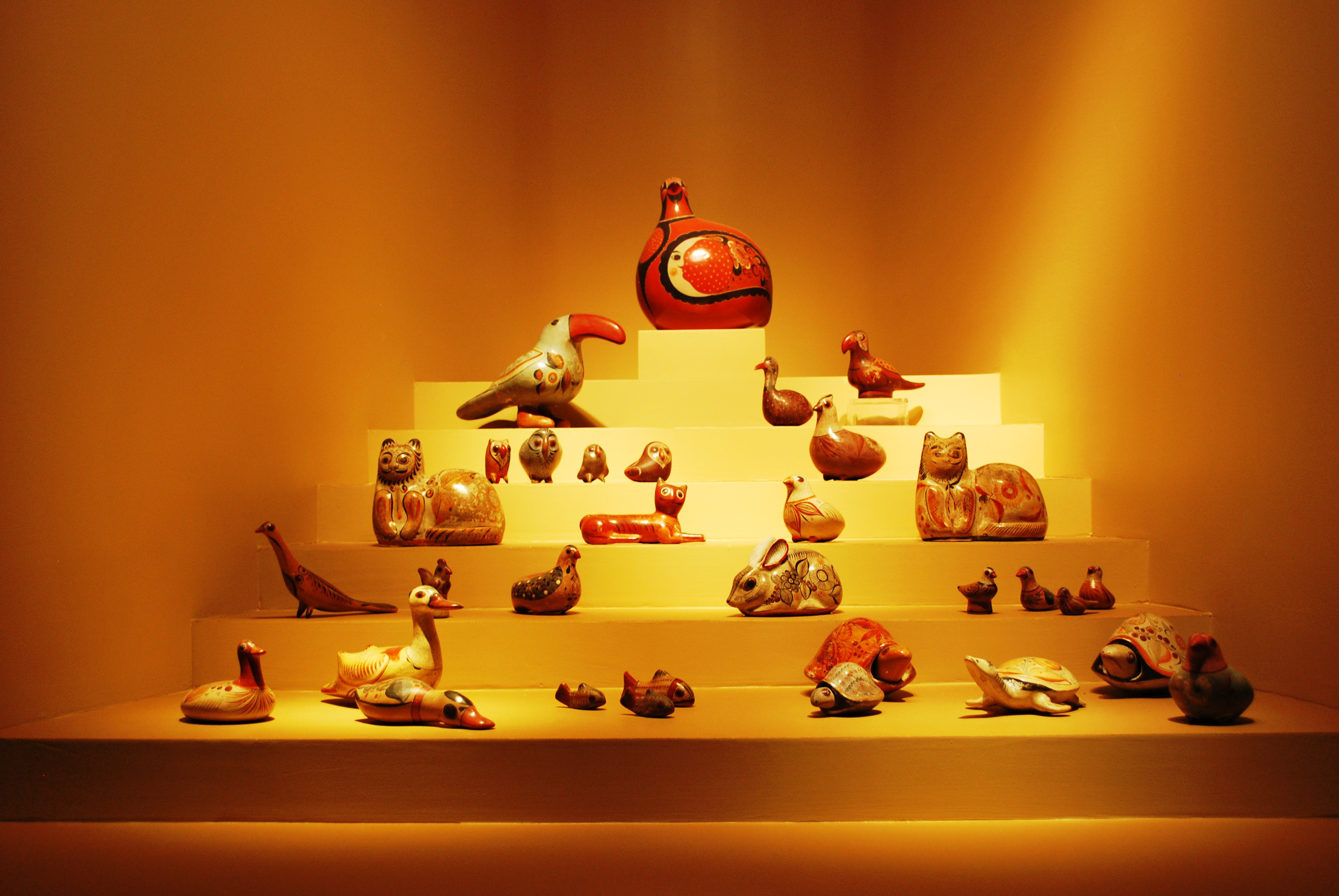
Ceramic animal figures from Tonalá

Tlaquepaque and Tonalá are Jalisco's major ceramics centers with international recognition for their techniques and decorative styles, with high fire ceramics their most important production. The best clay in Jalisco is found in the Tonalá and Tlaquepaque areas, especially that in the El Rosario community. This clay is so fine, that the resulting works are similar to porcelain.

Tonalá has long been recognized as a center for ceramics in Mexico. The streets are filled with artisan workshops and sidewalks stalls selling pottery and stoneware pieces. One thing that distinguishes Tonalá made ware is the decorative details. Two elements, the nahual and the "flor de Tonalá" are common. A nahual is a pre-Hispanic shape shifter or shaman, often drawn as a smiling cat. The flor de Tonalá (Tonalá flower) first appeared in pottery design in the early 20th century. Its distinctive shape is an oval center with rounded petals that form a scalloped design. These elements can appear in all of the types of pottery that is produced here. Market days, Thursday and Sunday, are a good chance to see a wide variety of ceramics of the region, all spread out on the streets of the downtown. While there are a wide variety of figures, utensils and decorative items, it is not all that is produced. Many manufacturers sell their wares through other channels. To find the best pieces, one needs to visit the workshops and factories.

Tonalá is known for its "barro de olor" (lit. aromatic clay) because the pieces made from it transmit its smell and flavor to water containers, especially the bruñido pieces, which is also an important ceramics for the town. One common type of bruñido or canelo item is animal figures, especially cats in Oriental poses, made by a molding process. Other common animals include ducks, fish, toucans, owls, chickens and doves. Another common ceramic is a kind of piggy bank, along with platters and plates, often decorated with vegetative motifs. One noted family from Tonalá in burnished pottery is the Jimón family. Another popular item are piggy banks which are painted in bright colors and glazed. High fire ceramics produced in Tonalá include a series of cooking pots which nestled one inside the other.

The town hosts an annual ceramics competition called the Concurso Nacional de la Cerámica Tonallan. In 2011, the total purse was 585,000 pesos, which was awarded to thirty two winners from fourteen different states in Mexico. The municipality is home to the Museo Nacional de la Cerámica (National Ceramic Museum), which director Prudencio Guzman Rodriguez considers to be a "link between Tonalá's tradition and people interested in researching our tradition". Established in 1986, the museum has a collection of 1000 pieces that range from pre-Hispanic artifacts to contemporary prizewinners. The institution was begun when a board of local artisans and businessmen with sculptors Jorge Wilmot and Ken Edwards to find a way to promote the ceramic tradition here. Many of the artifacts are on loan from the Instituto Nacional Indigenista (National Indigenous Institute), and a number were donated by Wilmot. The rest of the pieces are prizewinners from the Certamen Estatal de la Cerámica (State Ceramic Contest). Unfortunately by the mid-1990s, the museum has to close due to lack of funds and maintenance. The municipality stepped in and the museum was reopened in 1996. The collection contains pieces created by some of the most renowned artisans of the area and are of the styles most typical to Tonalá such as bruñido, bandera, petatillo and canelo. Artists and artisans represented include Salvador Vásquez, Juan Antonio Mateo, Gerónimo Ramos, Nicasio Pajarito, Candelario Medrano, Jorge Wilmot and Ken Edwards.

Near Tonalá are the small communities of Salatitlán, El Rosario and Tateposco which are also ceramics centers. Salatitlán is known for clay whistles formed by molds into shapes such as human and animal figures. El Rosario produces barro canelo but mostly as miniatures and toys such as miniature cookware. Another popular liquid container in the Tonala area is the tinaja, a squat jug with a handle at the top and a small spout. In Santa Cruz de la Huerta, near Tonala, specializes in clay drainpipes, some crudely fashioned toys and whistles in the shape of animals. Most of these products are sold in public markets. One exception to this is the work of Candelario Medrano, who makes curious, sometimes grotesque sculptures. In his workshop can be found double decked boats, church buildings with miniature people, and animals such as lions, roosters and owls with savage human faces. They tend to be large pieces, made partly by mold and partly by hand, then painted in bright, clashing acrylics.

In 2006, the group of Tonalteca potters from Tonalá, Jalisco received the National Prize for Arts in the Popular arts and traditions category.

== Tlaquepaque ==
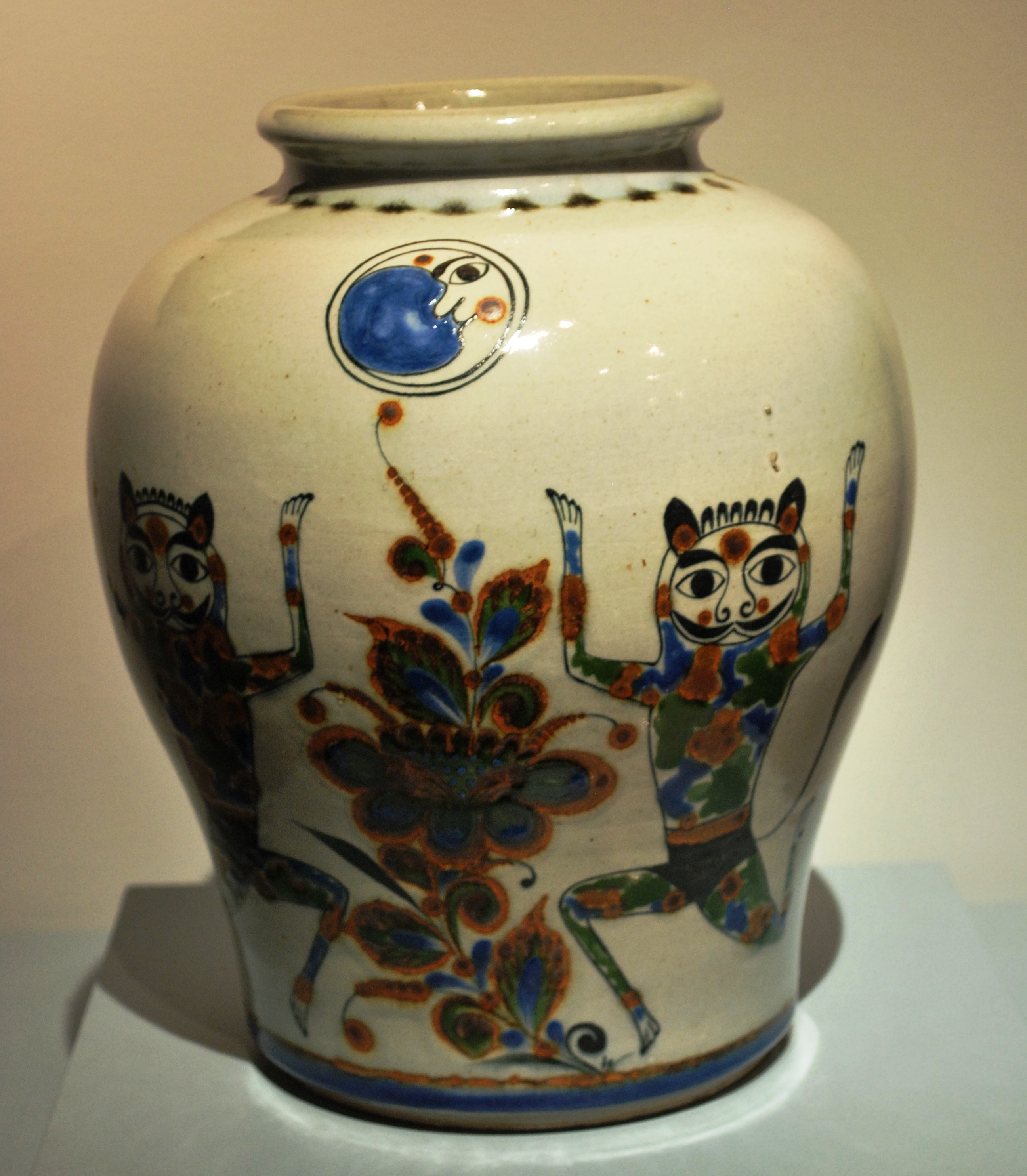
Stoneware vase with nahuals from Jalisco

Tlaquepaque is from the name Tlacapan, which roughly translates to "men who make clay utensils with their hands". The ceramics industry is based on seven different types of clay that are in the area. Much of the best ceramic of Tlaquepaque is sold in the various galleries that are in the town center along with other area crafts.

One specialty is the making of human figures, called "tipos populares" ("common guys") that measure between ten and twenty five centimeters in height. These figures include farmers, horsemen, fruit sellers, milkmen, fishermen, drunks and children playing. Other figures include creatures called "duendes" and sets for Nativity scenes. The heads, feet and hands are created through the use of molds but the bodies are handcrafted, often with elaborate detail, and painted in various colors. The main significance of many of these pieces is that they represent Mexico of the 19th century. Another series of figures includes all of the presidents of Mexico, complete or in bust form. Most of these measure about twelve centimeters. The most famous workshop here is that of the Panduro family, which maintain a set of molds from the 19th century. The Carranza family also makes figures, but uses wire frames as the basis for the figures, which are then covered in small balls of clay. These figures usually related to popular festivals such as bullfights, jaripeos and charreadas as well as Nativity scenes.

About 2,000 artisans such as Jose Garcia Quinones in Tlaquepaque preserve the tradition of making nativity scenes and other figures from clay. These nativity scenes can be whimsical with non-tradition animals such as lions and giraffe and even the Devil can appear. Garcia Quinones has won prizes for his work since he was a boy and each year for thirty years has sold his wares in Mexico City. Like other potters, the pieces are made at a home workshop with all members of the family contributing to the creation. Another potter, Justino Estuvier, over 70 years old, exports his wares to Spain. However, this aspect of the ceramics industry is fading in the municipality with far fewer potters than there used to be. Common artisans there battle to survive against the proliferation of plastic and cheaper ceramics from Asia. The average handcrafted nativity scene sells in Mexico for 350 pesos, when cheaper mass-produced ones sell for 160.

There are potters in Tlaquepaque that specialized in doing portraits of famous people in clay, including 19th-century presidents Porfiro Díaz and Benito Juárez. Pantaleón Panduro's portrait of Díaz was so good that the president himself offered to send the artisan to Italy to study, but Panduro declined. The Museo del Premio Nacional de la Ceramica Pantaleon Panduro is named after him, dedicated to exhibiting pieces from the Concurso Nacional de la Cerámica Tonallan and other competitions. It is the only one of its kind in Mexico dedicated to all of the various types of ceramics produced in the country. The works are organized by technique, origin and type of prize won.

The Museo Regional de la Ceramica is run by the Instituto de la Artesanía Jalisciense and the state government of Jalisco. It was founded in 1954 by the Instituto Nacional Indigenista and INAH. In 2011, the museum received on permanent loan two thousand pieces from the collection of the Comisión Nacional para el Desarrollo de los Pueblos Indígenas for exhibition. This agreement is part of the museum's mission to emphasise the handcrafts and art of indigenous peoples.

== Other ceramic centers ==
Another area noted for its ceramics is Sayula since the 19th century. One distinguishing characteristic is a blue tone which has not been duplicated anywhere else in the state. Sayula work reached its peak in the 19th century. Since then, however, the ceramics tradition here has been almost completely lost. Sayula pottery of the majolica type which uses a fine white clay. At its height, the work was sought by hacienda owners and the clergy. Background colors are applied as a slip and traditionally are of three colors, white, blue and pink, the last two being uncommon in majolica pottery. Decorative elements are almost always floral and/or vegetative and simple geometric patterns. Occasionally, figures such as humans and animals appear. Much of this ceramic is found as containers and as tiles, with tiles found on the houses and churches of the Sayula area. They can also be seen at the monastery of Santa María de Gracia in Guadalajara and the tiles on the city cathedral is also thought to come from here. Most of the production of this area is anonymous but some artisans do stand out such as Epigmenio Vargas and Isidro Real. It is thought that the major production of the area ended with the building of the railroads, which subjected the ceramic to competition.

Santa Cruz de las Huertas is near Guadalajara and known for its toys. Traditional piggy banks from here are black as well as a number of figures such as circus performers. Other items include multicolored whistles made of barro betus which are usually sold by the dozen. The most noted artisan from here is Candelario Medrano, who founded a style of ceramics followed by the area's artisans. Many of the toy figures produced here are large, multicolored and often of fantastic creatures such as lions with sun faces. Other toy sets include churches, kiosks and representations of Noah's Ark. This community also produces ceramic masks used to for the community's "Tastoanes" traditional dance.

== Selected distinguished potters from Jalisco ==
- Ángel Santos Juárez
- Florentino Jimón Barba
- Jesús Carranza Cortés
- Jesús José Berabe Campechano
- Nicasio Pajarito Gonzalez
- Salvador Vázquez Carmona
- Zenón Martínez García
