= Waraszkiewicz spiral =

In mathematics, Waraszkiewicz spirals are subsets of the plane introduced by Waraszkiewicz (1932). Waraszkiewicz spirals give an example of an uncountable family of pairwise incomparable continua, meaning that there is no continuous map from one onto another.
