= London Revolutionary Group =

Polish revolutionary group

London Revolutionary Group Gromada Rewolucyjna Londyn
- Abbreviation: GRL
- Founder: Zenon Świętosławski; Henryk Abicht; Jan Krynski; Ludwik Oborski
- Founded: 1858
- Dissolved: 1861
- Headquarters: London
- Ideology: Polish nationalism Revolutionary socialism Republicanism; Internationalism
- Political position: Left-wing
- International affiliation: International Association

London Revolutionary Group (Polish: Gromada Rewolucyjna Londyn, GRL) was a Polish social democratic revolutionary group based in London, England in the late 1850s and early 1860s. It was founded in 1856, and led by the exiles Zenon Świętosławski, Henryk Abicht, Jan Krynski and Ludwik Oborski, In 1858 they sought to make contact with the wider revolutionaries and international communists and plotted to overthrow the government in Poland, however, this action was thwarted by the Prussian police. Their aims were to abolish private property in Poland and to establish a global socialist republic.
