= Nicasio Pajarito Gonzalez =

- Born: October 13, 1935 (age 90); Tonalá, Jalisco
- Occupation: Mexican potter

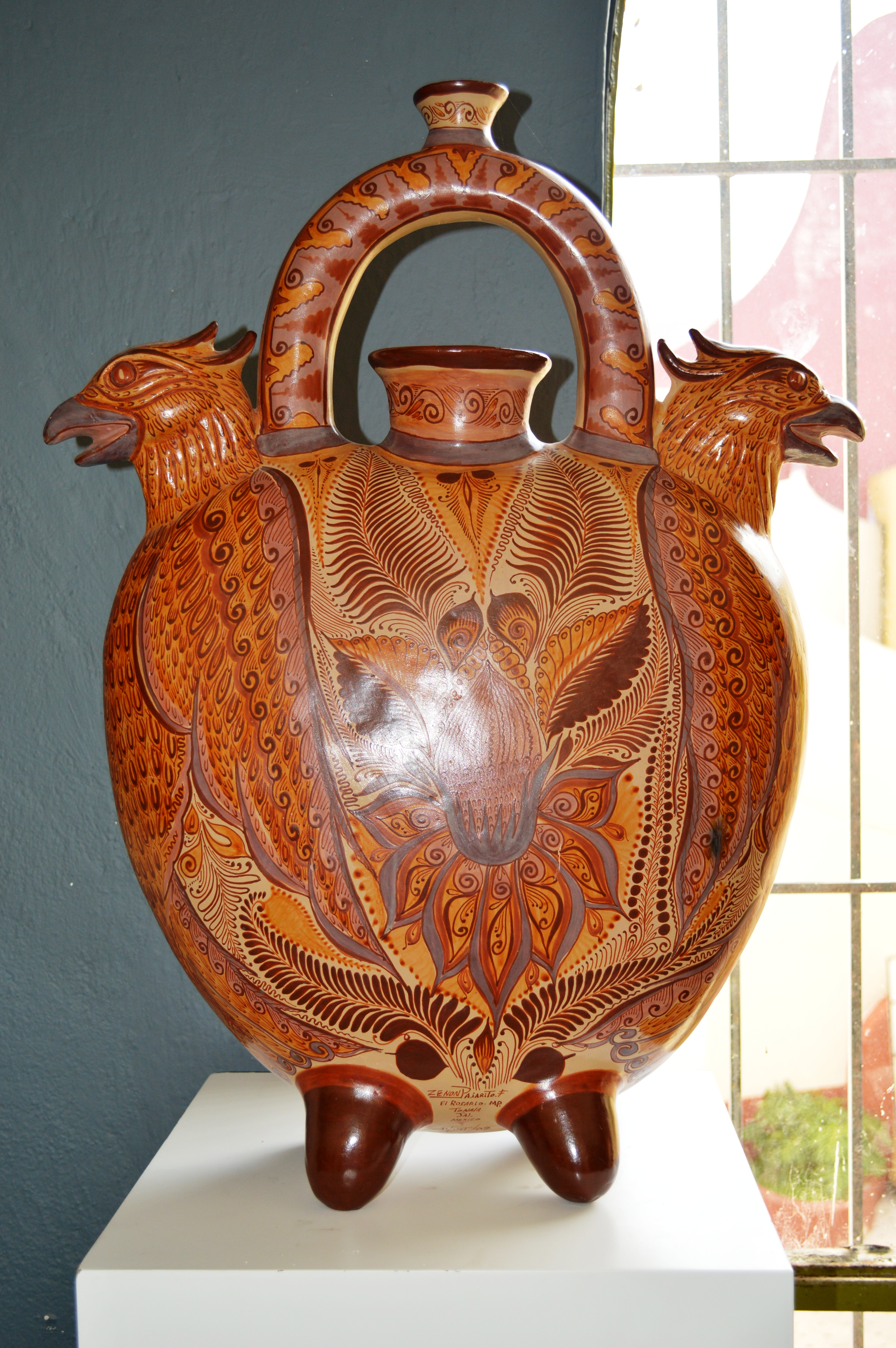
Canelo dispenser by the Pajarito family at the Museo Nacional de la Cerámica

Nicasio Pajarito Gonzalez (born October 13, 1935) is a Mexican potter from Tonalá, Jalisco known for his canelo ware.

Pajarito Gonzalez has worked with clay most of his life, with a career of over fifty years. He works in the regional styles of bruñido and canelo, but is particularly renowned for the latter. He continues to run his own workshop with his children Zenón and Isabel, who learned the craft from him, producing platters, large covered jars called tibores, jugs, dispensers in the form of bulls and horses. The last are unique to the workshop.

The pieces are mostly made of a mix of white clay from a town called Rosario and black clay from Tateposco, mixed in equal proportions, as well as red clay from various sources. The children do most of the prep work, cleaning, mixing and wetting the clay for molding and modeling, which includes working out the air bubbles by stomping it with the feet. Complicated pieces are made with a mixture of molding and modeling, smoothing the junctures with a stone. The piece is covered in a reddish clay slip and set out to dry and then this process is repeated. Pajarito Gonzalez considers to the mix of clays to be reflective of Mexico's mestizo heritage.

The pieces are decorated with earth colors generally with an overall tone of cinnamon to reddish after firing. The Pajarito family creates its own paints using the same clay as the pieces, sometimes adding other mineral pigments. They also create their own brushes from the hair of various animals. The larger decorative elements are painted first, with the details added over top. Many of these designs are unique to the family and include flowers, fretwork and palm leaves. When dry, the colors are set by burnishing the piece with great force, which also seals the pores. Then the piece is fired in a wood kiln for three hours to obtain the overall cinnamon color and shine. This technique of burnishing and firing only once is reminiscent of pre Hispanic pottery.

He has exhibited his work at the Museo Nacional de la Cerámica in Tonalá and received various awards in both Mexico and abroad including the 2002 Galardón Presidencial of the Premio Nacional de la Cerámica in Tlaquepaque. In 2001, he was named a “grand master” by the Fomento Cultural Banamex.

In 2012, he joined with other noted Tonalá artisans to found the Tesoros del Arte Tonalteca Gallery in the town.
