= Zenonas =

- Gender: Male
- Language: Lithuanian

Origin
- Region of origin: Lithuania

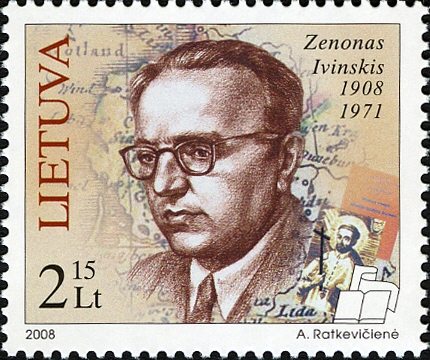
Zenonas Ivinskis pictures on a 2008 Lithuanian stamp

Zenonas is a Lithuanian masculine given name, a cognate of Zenon. Individuals with the name Zenonas include:

- Zenonas Petras Adomaitis (born 1945), Lithuanian politician
- Zenonas Ivinskis (1908–1971), Lithuanian historian
- Zenonas Juknevičius (1949–2026), Lithuanian lawyer and politician
- Zenonas Petrauskas (1950–2009), Lithuanian lawyer and politician
- Zenonas Puzinauskas (1920–1995), Lithuanian basketball player
- Zenonas Streikus (born 1954), Lithuanian politician
