= Museo Regional de la Ceramica, Tlaquepaque =

Ceramic museum in Tlaquepaque, Jalisco, Mexico

Coordinates: 20°38′20.94″N 103°18′52.9″W

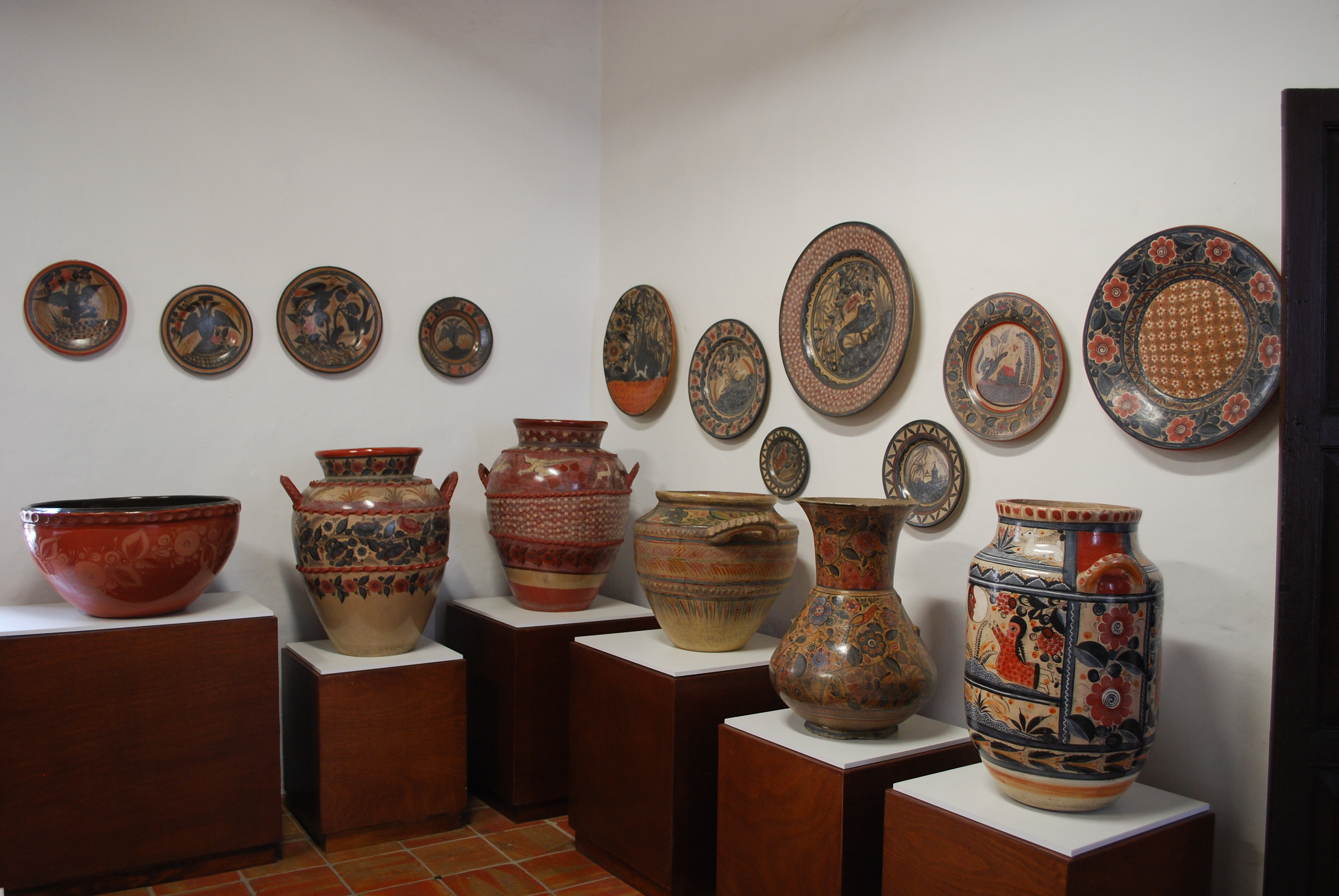
One of the display areas in the museum

The Museo Regional de la Cerámica (Regional Ceramic Museum) in Tlaquepaque, Jalisco, Mexico is located on Independencia Street in the center of the city. The museum is one of two main ceramics museums in the city, with the other being the Pantaleon Panduro Museum . It was established in 1954 to preserve and promote indigenous handcrafts of Jalisco, especially the state’s ceramic tradition. The emphasis is still on ceramics but the museum also has a room dedicated to Huichol art and holds events related to various types of indigenous crafts and culture.

== History of institution and building ==
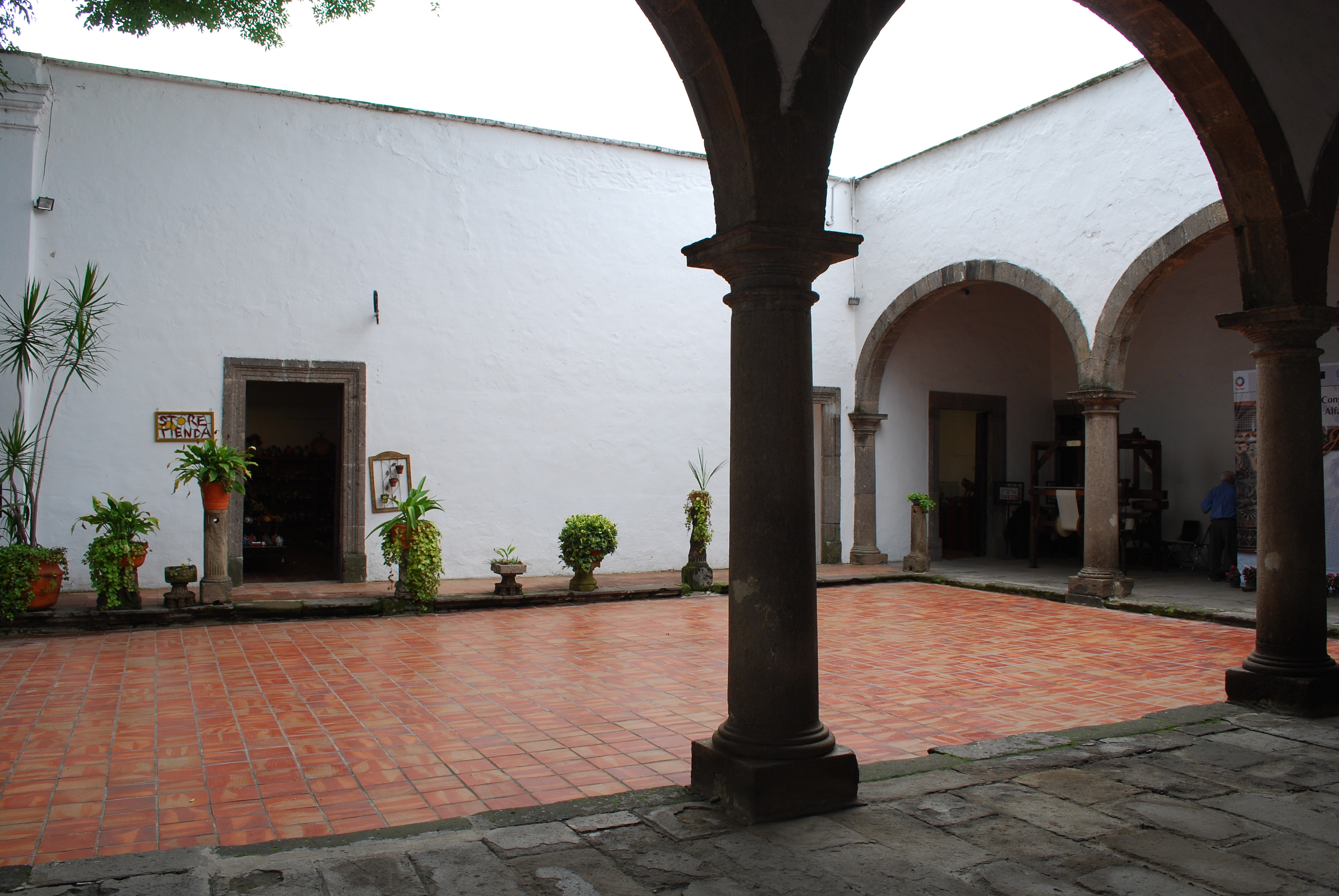
Courtyard of the former hacienda house

The museum was founded in 1954 by the Instituto Nacional Indigenista and the Instituto Nacional de Antropología e Historia, to promote and preserve indigenous arts with emphasis on ceramics. The original collection was assembled by historian Isabel Marin de Pallen, working under the direction of Daniel F. Rubin de la Borbolla, one of the most important handcrafts and folk art collectors from Jalisco. The Instituto Nacional Indigenista is now the Instituto de la Artesania Jalisciense and the museum was reinaugurated in 1998 under state control. However, the museum still maintains active participation in the preservation of indigenous handcrafts and folk art along with newer ceramic traditions. In 2008, the museum held an event called “Mexico Indigena en el Corazon de Jalisco” (Indigenous Mexico in the heart of Jalisco), which highlighted various indigenous peoples. It included exhibitions, workshops, conferences and more. In 2011, the la Comisión Nacional para el Desarrollo de los Pueblos Indígenas agreed to lend the museum 2,400 pieces from its rational indigenous arts collection for exhibition. The pieces in the collection was selected to represent the various indigenous cultures of Mexico. The museum offers guided tours and classes in painting, ceramics and other handcrafts.

The building which contains the museum is located on the pedestrian only Independencia Street in what is now the center of Tlaquepaque. However, it began as the main house of a hacienda which dates from the colonial era. This main house itself was built in the 19th century and was the property of José Francisco Velvardo y de la Moro, who earned the nickname of “Burro de Oro” (Donkey of Gold) during his lifetime. His military service included that under General Antonio López de Santa Anna and he was executed for his support of Emperor Maximilian I of Mexico . The house is now a historic monument. The house was converted into a museum in 1954, with the various rooms turned into exhibition halls. The main purpose of the museum is the rescue, preservation and promotion of the traditional handcrafts of Jalisco, especially ceramics. The state of Jalisco has an important ceramics tradition, especially that made in Tonalá among the Nahua communities. The building surrounds a large courtyard which contains fifteen stands with vendors selling handcrafts. These vendors vary each weekend and usually are indigenous from the Nahua and Wixarika peoples. However, other cultures such has the Mixtec, the Triqui, the Purépecha, Mazahua and Otomi have been invited to participate.

== The collection ==
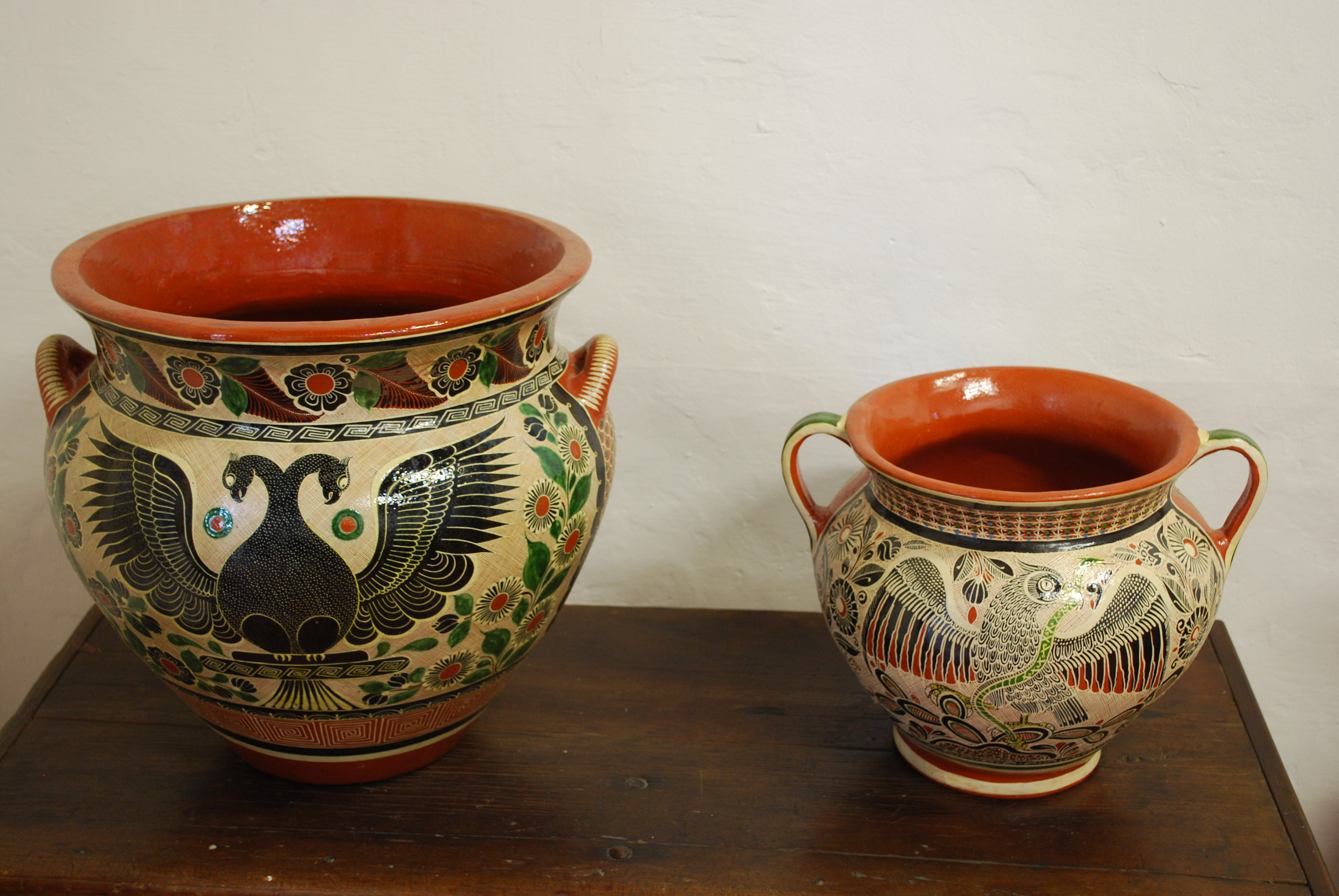
Two pots in Sala 1

The museum exhibits ceramic pieces and some other handcrafts from various parts of Mexico but focuses primarily on the primary ceramic producing areas of Jalisco such as Tonalá, Santa Cruz de las Huertas, El Rosario, Tlaquepaque, Zalatitlán and Tateposco . These areas are mostly concentrated in the Valley of Atemajac except for some made in the nearby Sayula mountain range, which is included because of its quality. There are nine rooms dedicated to the exhibition of the permanent collection with a tenth set aside for temporary exhibits, mostly focused on Mexican handcrafts, folk art and folklore. The museum’s permanent collection offers a view of the regional ceramics and the history of its development. It contains pieces from the 17th and 18th centuries along pieces from contemporary masters.

The Valley of Atemajac area is known for a number of pottery styles including a number exclusive to it. These include bandera, canelo, petatillo, bruñido, betus, high fire and engretado, which are named decoration styles except for high fire, which is named for firing at high temperatures. Major artisans featured at the museum include Candelario Medrano, Salvador Vázquez, Rodo Padilla, Juan Campechano, Margarito Núñez, Jesús and Ángel Carranza, Kent Edward, Jorge Wilmot, the Jimón family, the Barnabé family, the Pajarito family and the Panduro Family.

The barro bruñido tradition is represented with flasks, pots, jars and storage containers from Tonalá. This is the best known ceramic style from the area, probably descended from polychrome pottery produced from the 19th century. The name comes from the fact that these pieces are not glazed, but rather they are given a slip and then polished with a stone or pyrite. Many of these pieces are slender necked jugs or lamp bases, often decorated with animals, such as rabbits, with distorted characteristics, giving them a surreal look. The pieces are usually painted with delicate tones of rose, gray-blue and white on a background of a light coffee color, light gray and sometimes green or blue. Each piece is individually created. The attraction of this pottery is its appearance, as it is too porous to hold any liquid or food. One exception is a water container with a fat body and long neck, with a ceramic cup placed upside down over the neck. These are called botellones are carafes. Most of the pieces with the oldest designs are in barro bruñido, which include pieces with antique floral motifs in indigo and countryside scenes depicting the Valley. Also in the bruñido category are two very large plates by Amado Galvan, a potter from first half of the 20th century who gained fame for his designs which imitate the art of the 19th century.

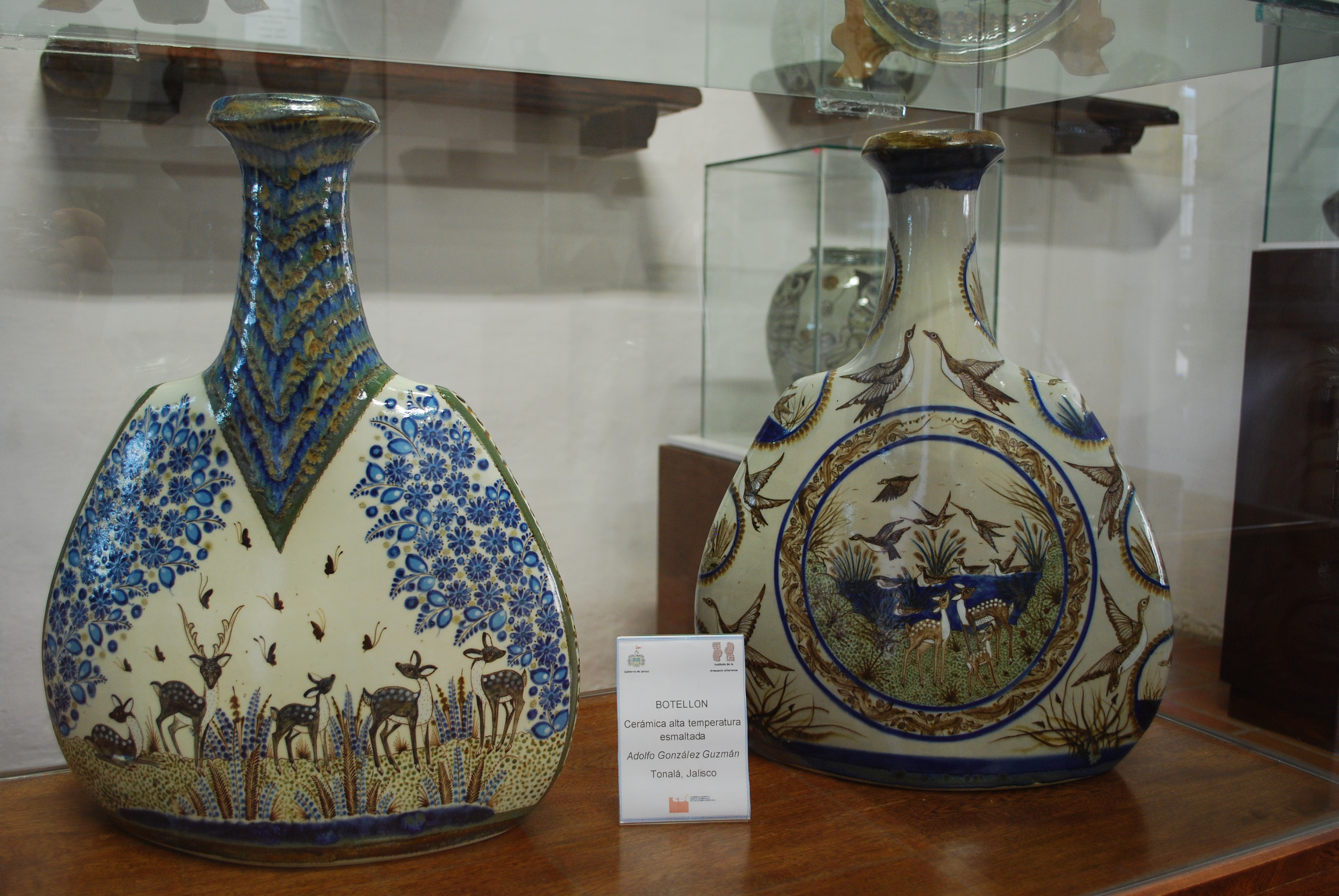
Two flasks by Carlos Villanueva

The museum’s betus ceramic collection comes from the community of Santa Cruz de las Huertas. This pottery has a bone colored crystalline finish which is comparable to Japanese ceramics. It is also characterized by vibrant colors that give the ceramics a whimsical look. The name from the betus oil the clayware is immersed in before it is fired. The oil, which is made of a resin extracted from pine trees, gives the painted pottery its brilliant sheen. The main crafter of the barro betus on display is Candelario Medrano.

There is one room dedicated to petatillo pottery, including some of the first pieces in this style ever made. Petatillo pieces are distinguished by tightly drawn lines or crosshatching in a red background. These lines are named after straw mats called petates, which they resemble. Above the lines stylized images of plants and animals, especially deer, rabbits, eagles, roosters and swans, are drawn. Often the main figures are banded in black and spare use of green completes the set. This ware is painted before firing, glazed, and then fired again. It is very labor-intensive and rare, mostly showing up on platters. A giant urn in this style can take up to three years to complete. The best known pieces have been made by the Lucano, Bernabé, Vázquez, Pajarito, Jimón and other families.

Canelo is named for the color the fired clay turns out, which is various shades of cinnamon (canela in Spanish). It is popular and used mainly for water jugs because it is good for keeping liquid cool.

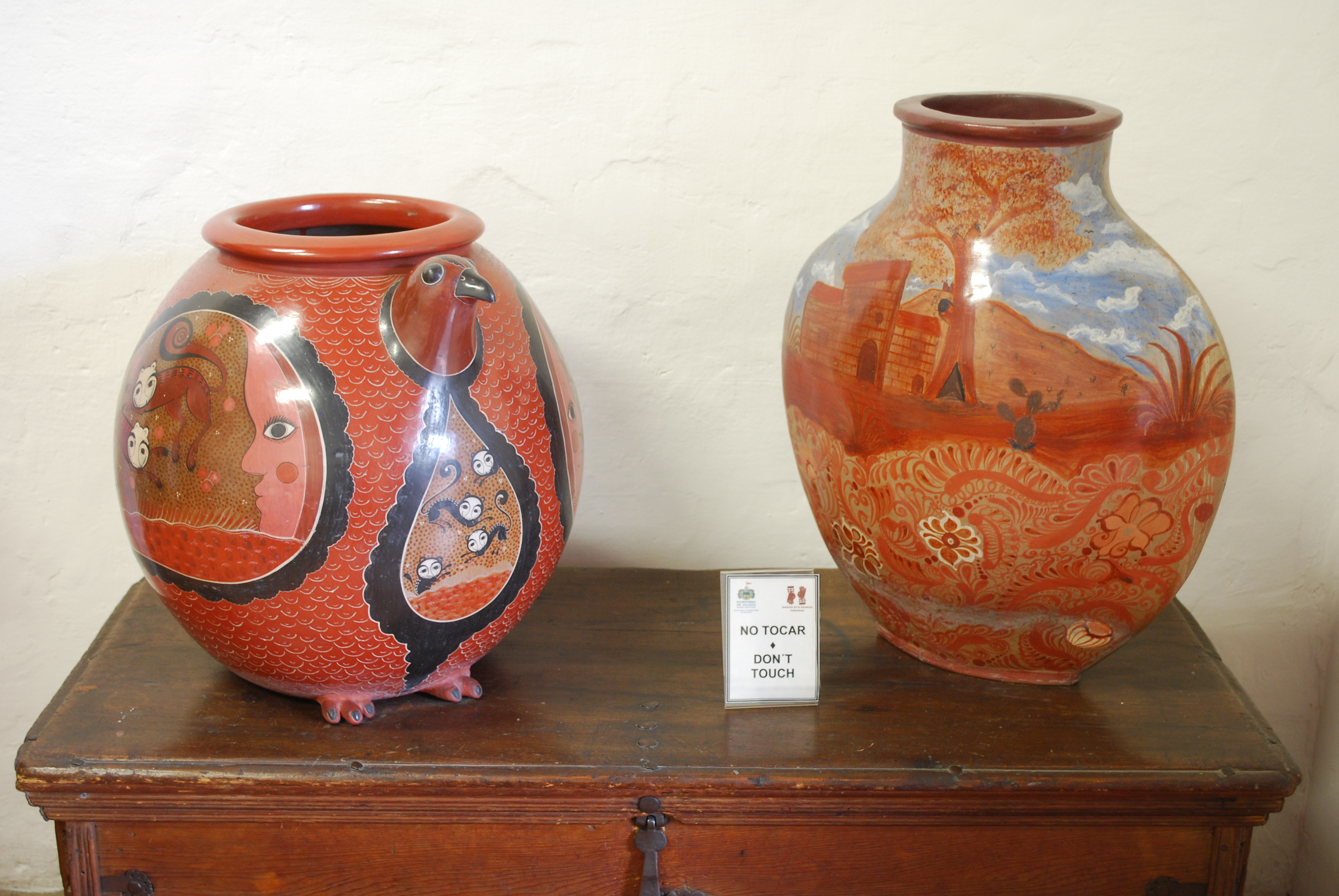

Bandera, which means "flag" in Spanish, is so named because it has the green-red-and-white colors of the Mexican flag. Red is commonly used as the background color, while the green and white are used for the decorative details. It is also an unglazed burnished ware. For unknown reasons, this style of pottery is very rare. One uncommon ware is called engregado. These objects have a special varnish that make them useful for cooking, the varnish acting like a coating of Teflon that prevents food from slicking when heated.

High fire ceramics are not endemic to Jalisco, but stoneware and other types were introduced to the area in the 1960s and developed by Jorge Wilmot and Ken Edwards. Works of both artisans are on display at the museum.

Several rooms of the museum contain displays of toys, masks and various types of ceramic figures, such as charros, soldiers and more. These include popular figures made by Ponciano and Rosa de Panduro and miniature figures by Ángel Carranza. Carranza’s work is mostly based on everyday figures such as El Nevero de Garrafa (ice cream seller), El Vendedor de Flores (flower seller] and El Carbonero (charcoal maker) . There is a group of Mexico’s past and present presidents made by José Luis Núñez and a rare set of figures related to the making of pottery including extraction of clay, kneading, shaping and firing done by Honorato Panduro.

In the courtyard area, there is a collection of richly decorated ceramic bathtubs from the 19th century. A number of these are decorated with double headed eagles.

One room is dedicated to the recreation of a late 19th century/early 20th century Mexican kitchen. The kitchen consists of a parapet of rubblestone masonry covered over in brick in which charcoal burning stoves are inlaid. The kitchen contains numerous pieces of ceramics similar to those used at the time. It also contains some of ceramics which have won the Premio Nacional de la Cerámica (National Ceramics Prize).

Among the non ceramic displays at the museum, there is one room dedicated to Huichol art and a display dedicated to blown glass.
