= Salvador Vázquez Carmona =

Mexican potter (born 1933)

Salvador Vázquez Carmona (born December 23, 1933) is a Mexican potter from the crafts town of Tonalá, Jalisco, who specializes in a regional ceramic style called bruñido. He has been called the best artisan in Tonalá and has trained a number of other notable potters.

Vázquez Carmona began working with clay when he was six, learning from his mother. Later he worked at the workshop of Jorge Wilmot for twenty years, learning other ceramic techniques. Here, he developed his own style, distinct from that of Wilmot. Eventually Vázquez Carmona established his own workshop at his home where he continues to work with his children. This workshop is open to the public and listed among the attractions with Fodor’s travel guide.

He specializes in bruñido type pottery painted with natural colors, generally creating large pieces such as flower vases, round cooking pots, large jars called “tibores,” and platters, using locally mined clay in white, black and red, creating pieces with molds and by hand. He has rescued various traditional designs and created new ones. He creates both traditional and innovative designs. One of his favorite motifs is that of Saint James Matamoros, but he also paints geometric designs, suns, stylized flowers, other vegetation, eagles, serpents, Tastoanes dancers and birds such as doves.

His work has been exhibited in contests and exhibitions in Mexico and has won various prizes and other recognitions, such as the 1999 Galardón Presidencial of the Premio Nacional de la Cerámica.
