= Ángel Santos Juárez =

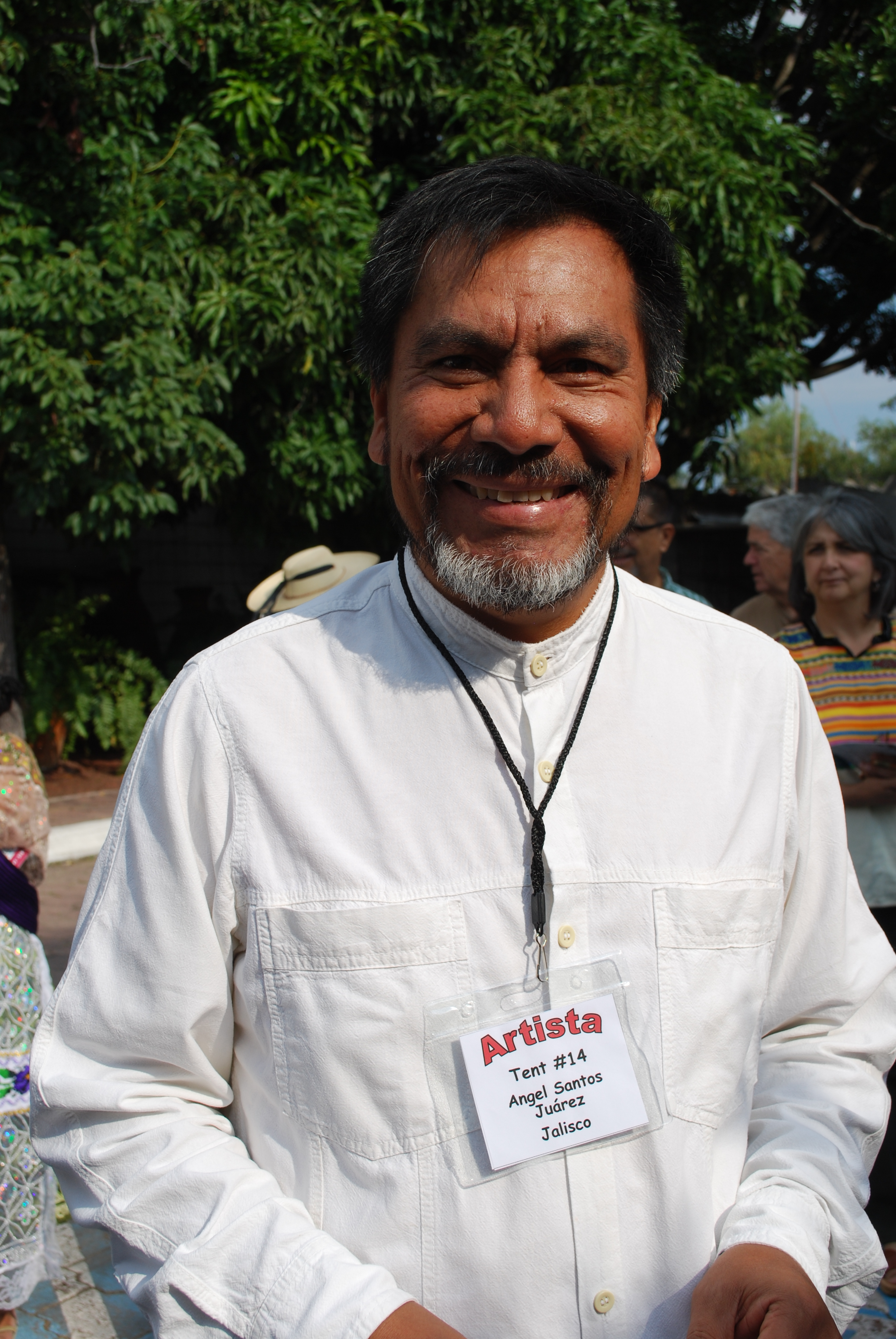
Ángel Santos Juárez at the Feria Maestros del Arte in Chapala, Jalisco

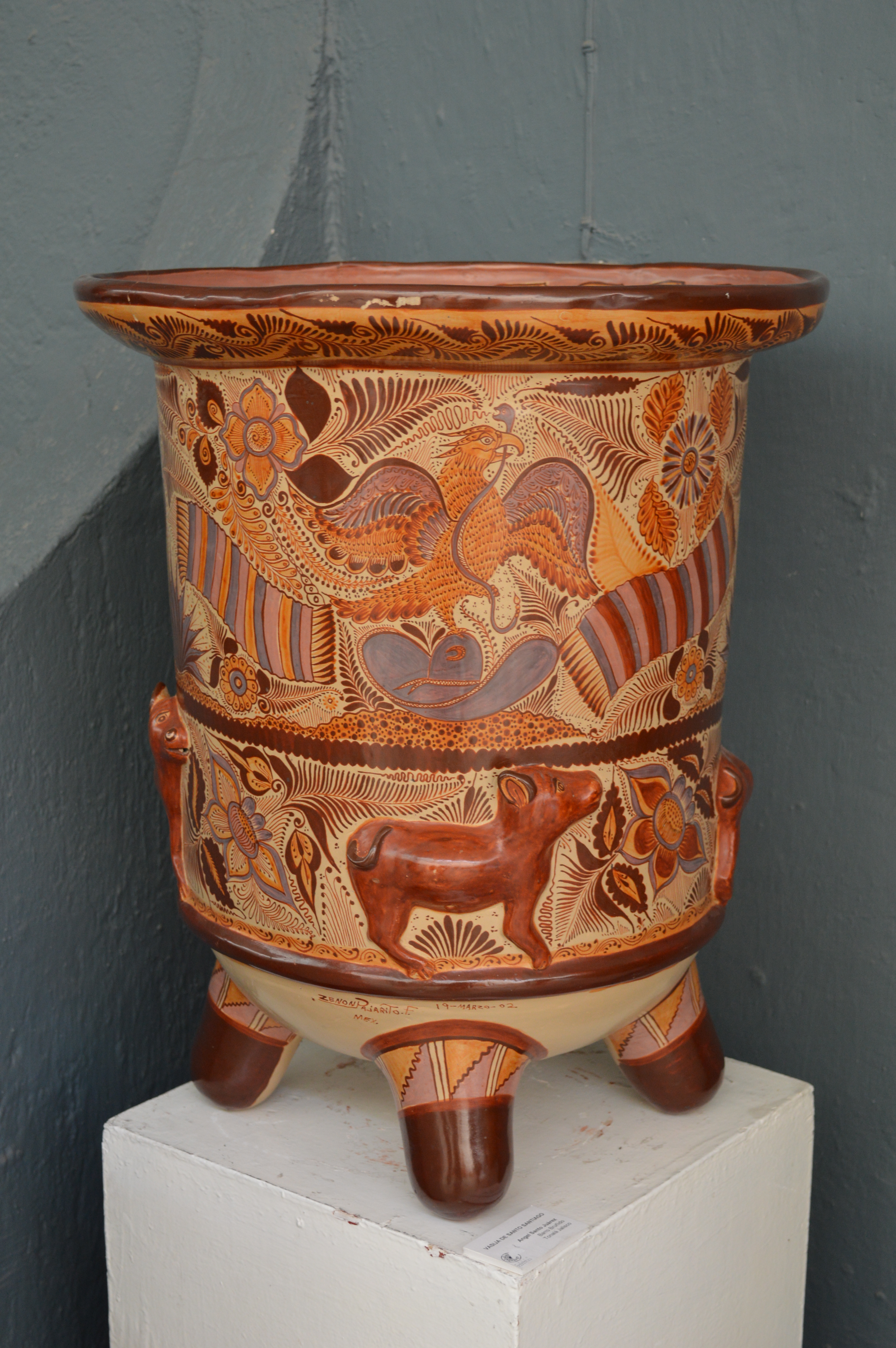
Barro bruñido jug by Santo Juarez at the Museo Nacional de la Ceramica in Tonala, Jalisco

Ángel Santos Juárez (born on April 10, 1964) is a Mexican potter known for his miniatures and decorative work, which has won various awards.

== Biography and achievements ==
Santo Juárez was born in the state of Zacatecas but moved to noted ceramics town of Tonalá, Jalisco when he was a small child. He showed interest and talent in the craft at a young age, starting as an apprentice with Manuel Silva and the Silva/Palomino family when he was only seven. He particularly showed talent in the creation of miniatures and punteado design (painting images using small dots) .

He has his own workshop in Tonalá by the time he was seventeen, where he continues to work along with his wife Alicia Jauregui Muñoz, two children and several employees. He has also obtained degrees in graphic design and sculpture at the University of Guadalajara.

Santos Juárez initially became known for his miniature pieces such as shot glasses and toy-sized versions of jars, cantaros, jewelry and other items. Today he also produces larger pieces such as storage containers, cups, plates and bowls.

The artisan’s clay working method is similar to others who work with the bruñido method. He works with different mixtures of white and black clays, mixing the two in different proportions depending on what is being made. He begins processing a batch of clay by stomping it with his bare feet and uses molds for the basic shapes. These are then polished with smooth stones and left to dry. They are then dipped in a clay slip, most often sand colored to provide the background color and seal the clay. After this, the piece is burnished, or rubbed with a pyrite stone to give it shine and fix the colors. Then the pieces are fired.

What distinguishes Santos Juárez’s work is his decorative painting. He did not grow up in a Tonalá ceramics family and is not as bound to traditional motifs as other area potters. Instead, he takes these designs and modifies them to his own style, which is noted for its fineness of line and detail. Motifs include animals, flowers and tropical leaves in movement.

His work has been exhibited at the Alfa Planetarium in Monterrey, the National Ceramics Museum in Tonala, the Ohio State Gallery in the United States. It is also found in public and major private collections in Mexico, the United States, Canada, Taiwan and China, in institutions such as Cigarrera La Moderna, the Fomento Cultural Banamex, the San Ildefonso College and FONART.

He has participated in numerous national and international competitions, winning over twenty five awards in Mexico alone. He has held workshops and presentations in France, China, various cities in the United States and in Mexico.

Santos Juárez also founded a non profit organization called Herencia Milenaria, a group of artisans who work to exhibit outside of Mexico. In 2006, this group won the National Award for Science and Arts.
