= Zenon Świętosławski =

Polish emigre and socialist utopian

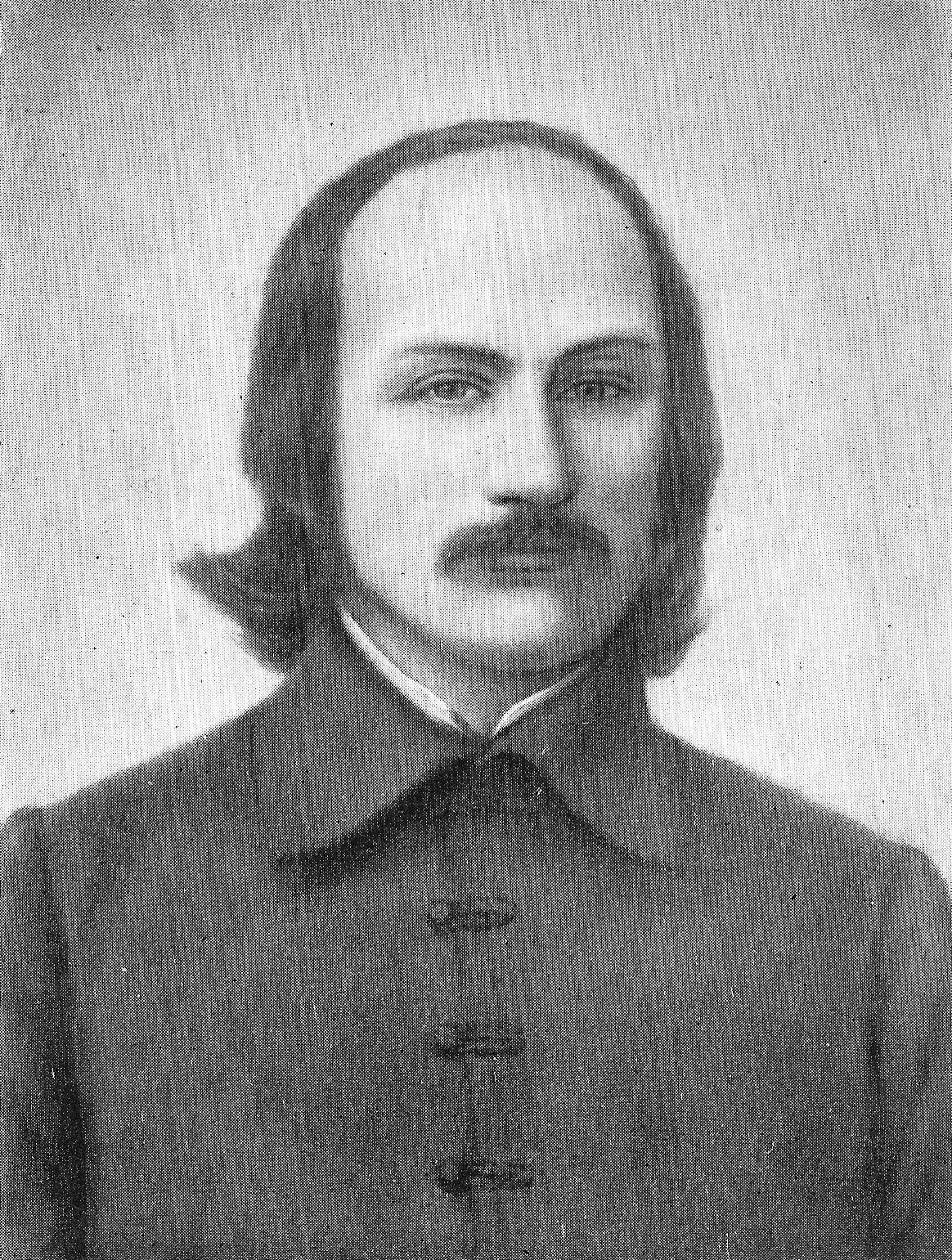
- Born: December 22, 1811; Warsaw, Duchy of Warsaw
- Died: December 6, 1875 (aged 63); St Helier, Jersey, United Kingdom
- Political party: Gromady Rewolucyjnej Londyn

Zenon Bolesław Świętosławski (December 22, 1811 in Warsaw – December 6, 1875 in St Helier, Jersey) was a Polish emigre and socialist utopian, participant of the November Uprising in 1830. He earned a living as a printer.

He was a member of the Polish Democratic Society, and co-founder and ideologist of the Gromady Rewolucyjnej Londyn in London along with Henryk Abicht, Jan Krynski and Ludwik Oborski, He published a collection of documents in exile in England.
