= Adolf Abicht =

Polish-Lithuanian physician

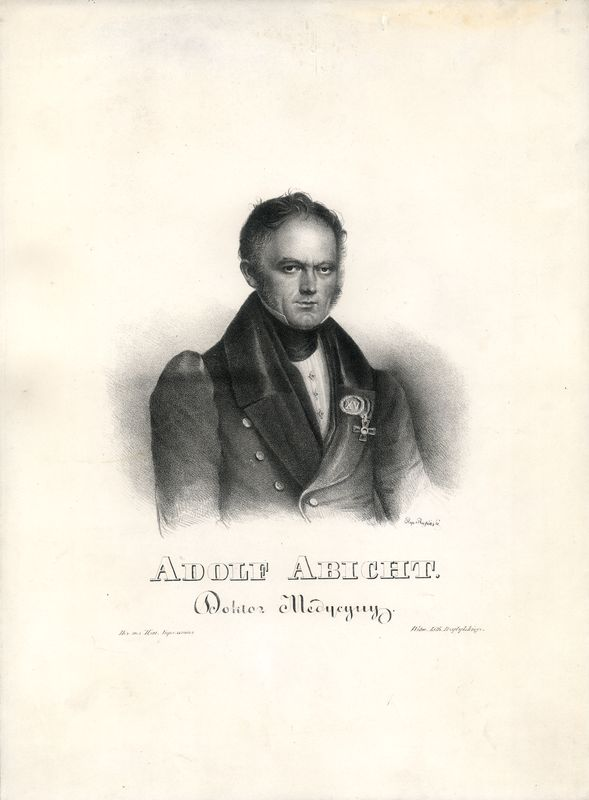
Adolf Abicht (1793–1860)

Adolf Abicht (1793–1860) was a Polish-Lithuanian medical doctor. He was a professor of general pathology, therapy, and medical history at the Vilnius University, and was a president of the Medical Society in Vilnius from 1829 to 1838.
