= Henryk Abicht =

Polish independence activist

Henryk Abicht (1835–1863) was a Polish independence activist and exile, a member of the Polish Democratic Society. He was considered to be a prominent Polish socialist.

Abicht was born in Vilnius. In 1857 he emigrated to London, where he collaborated with Zenon Świętosławski, who worked in printing. From 1859 he was an associate of Alexander Herzen and publisher of Kolokol. In 1862 he came to Warsaw as an emissary of the Gromady Rewolucyjnej Londyn of London which he had led along with Świętosławski, Jan Krynski and Ludwik Oborski. It caused an outrage that he had been able to reenter Poland under a British passport using the alias of John Bret. He tried to persuade the peasants to start a national uprising. A participant of the January Uprising, he fell into an ambush during the attack on the van with the money. On November 20, 1862 he was captured by the Russians and was killed shortly afterwards in Warsaw.
