= Florentino Jimón Barba =

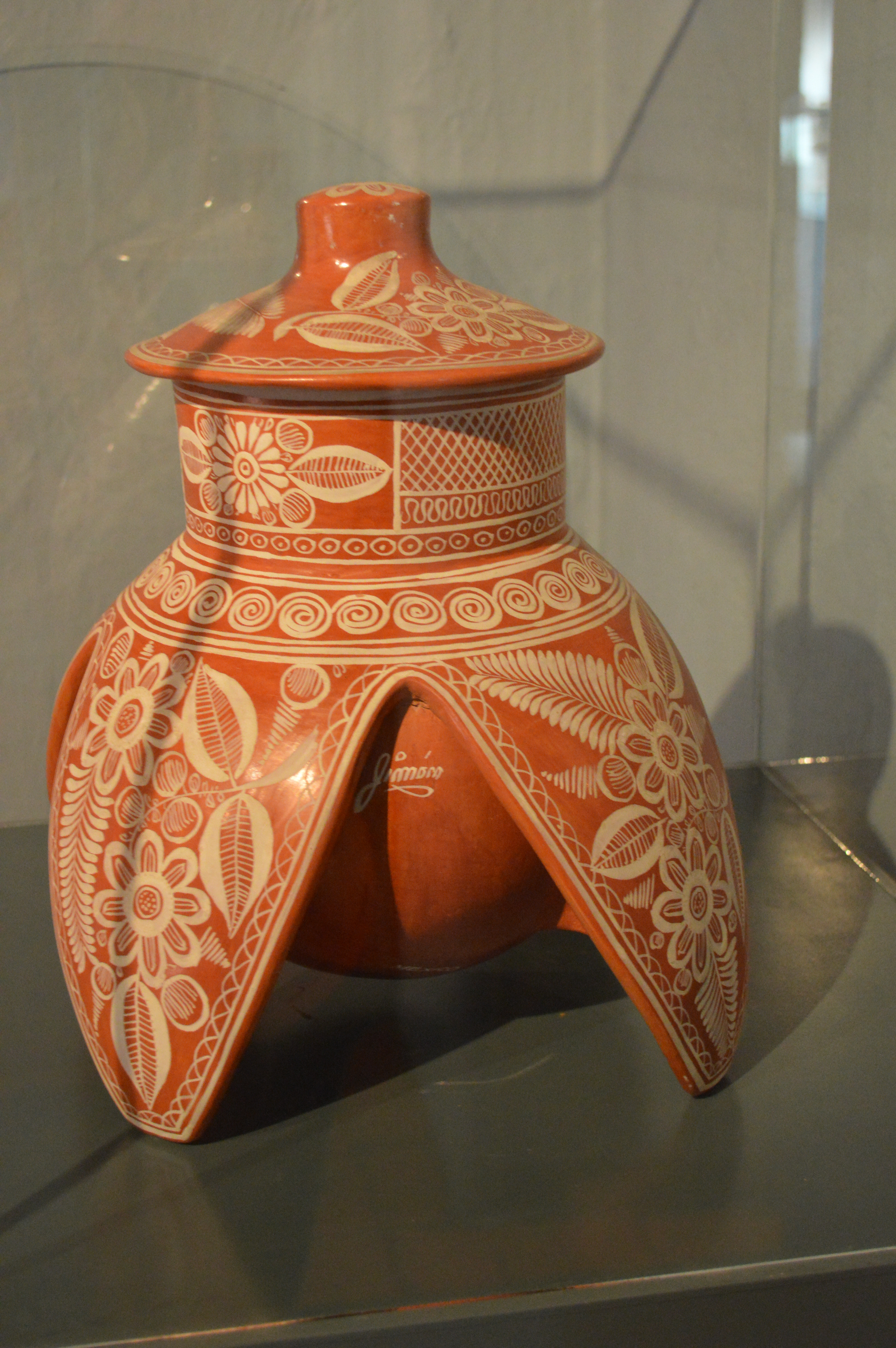
"Granada" by the artisan at the Museo Nacional de la Cerámica

Florentino Jimón Barba is a Mexican potter based in Tonalá, Jalisco.

Jimón Barba is the head of a ceramics family with over fifty years of experience. This began with Florentino's father, Agustín Jimón, who began working with clay as a child and later taught his son. Today, the children of this family grow up around clay and pottery at the family workshop in Tonalá.

Jimón Barba primarily works in bruñido and bandera, types of Jalisco pottery. Most of the bruñido (burnished) pieces are miniatures. Bandera pottery is so-called as it has a red background with the designs painted on in white and green, the colors of the Mexican flag.

Jimón Barba is noted for his traditional ceramics techniques, using white, black, and red clays obtained locally. Unlike most ceramics families in Tonalá, they do not work the raw clay with their feet, feeling that this damages the clay and disrespects it. Instead, they use their hands. He creates the pieces by hand and with molds. After drying, the pieces are then covered in a slip to seal the pores and make the background color uniform. The paints are made from slips and minerals, rather than commercial or industrial paints. This includes the whites, which are difficult to grind and must be used before they turn grey.

The artisan and his family create round pots, large jars called “tibores,” cantaros, flower vases, platters, bowls, and other utilitarian items, as well as miniatures, storage boxes, and decorative spheres. Decorative motifs include James the Greater in various forms, eagles, serpents, Tastoanes, naguals, stylized flowers, other vegetation and suns.

Jimón Barba's work has won awards in both Mexico and abroad. He was named a “grand master” by the Fomento Cultural Banamex.
