= Zenon Waraszkiewicz =

Polish mathematician

Zenon Waraszkiewicz (1909–1946) was a Polish mathematician who introduced Waraszkiewicz spirals.
