= Zenon B. Lukosius =

United States Navy sailor

- Born: August 24, 1918; Chicago, Illinois
- Died: August 12, 2006 (aged 87); Harvey, Illinois
- Military career
- Allegiance: United States
- Branch: US Navy
- Service years: 1941–1945
- Rank: Chief Motor Machinist's Mate
- Conflicts: World War II
- Awards: Silver Star

Zenon B. Lukosius (August 24, 1918 – August 12, 2006) was an American World War II veteran who was a member of the U.S. Navy crew that captured the German submarine U-505, in 1944. This was the first time that the US Navy had captured an enemy ship since the nineteenth century. More importantly the Americans captured a code book that enabled Allied forces to more frequently pinpoint other German vessels.

== Early life ==
Lukosius was born on August 24, 1918, and he was raised in Chicago. He was of Lithuanian descent. His father was killed in an accident when he was 14 years old, and he dropped out of school to help support his mother. Later, he enlisted in the Navy during World War II, and became a U.S. Navy ship mechanic aboard the USS Pillsbury.

== Capturing the U-505 ==
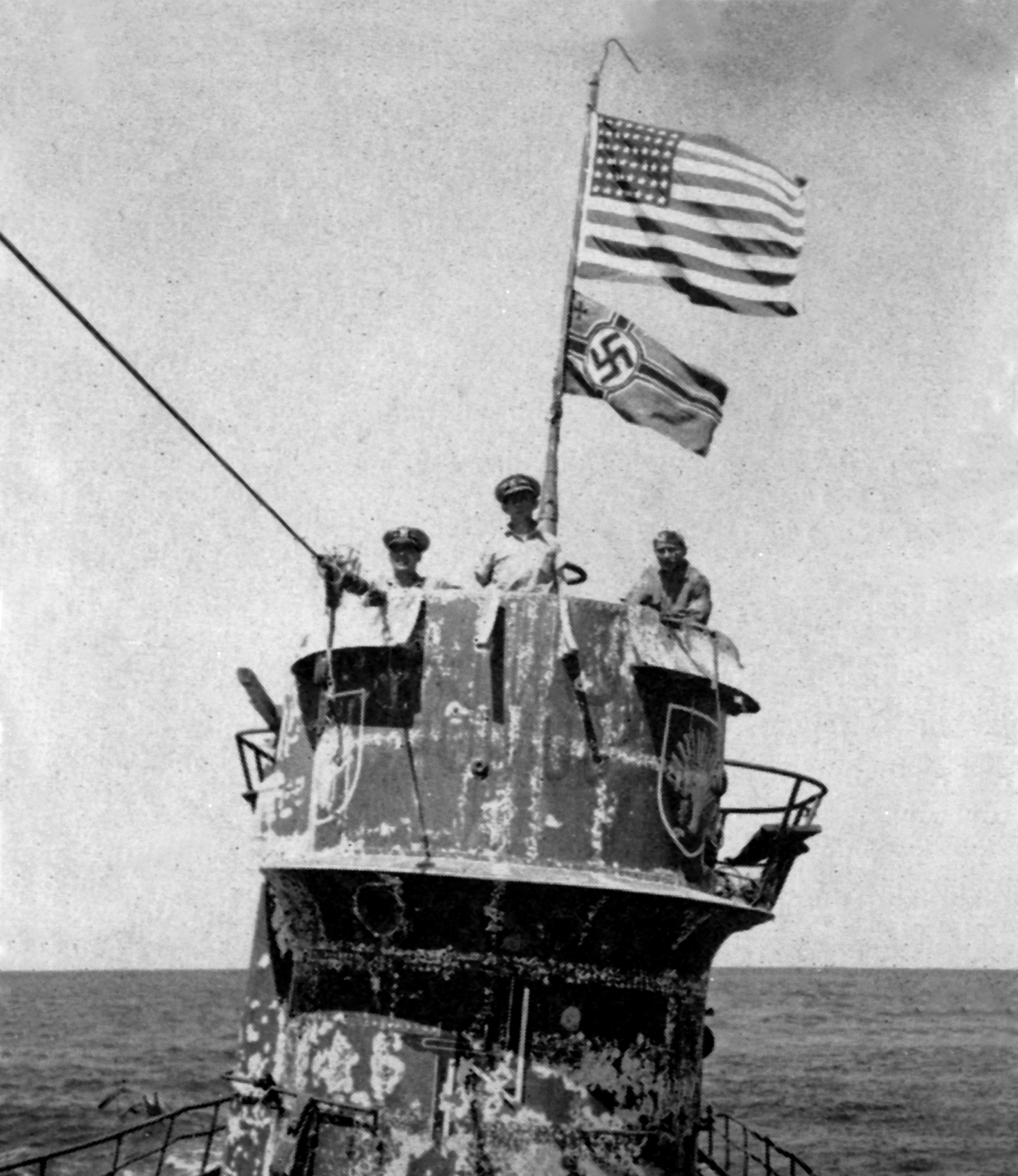
U-505 captured by the U.S. Navy

On June 4, 1944, Lukosius and eight other men were assigned to Task Group 22.3, which was to board and secure the U-505 submarine. Six of the nine men sent, including Lukosius, survived.

When the crew descended to capture the submarine, fleeing German crew members had opened a valve in the control room in an attempt to sink the boat before the Americans could salvage it. It was suspected to contain booby-traps that might scuttle it or impede its capture. There were however, no such traps and the Americans managed to close the valve that was allowing water to enter. This was the first time that the U.S. Navy had captured an enemy ship, since the nineteenth century. More importantly, the Americans found a code book which filled a gap in Allied cryptographers' understanding of German communications: a special code for geographic positions.

For the successful capture of the submarine, Lukosius received the Silver Star.

== Later life ==
After the war, Lukosius and his wife, Dorothy, settled in South Holland, Illinois. He worked in construction for 37 years, working on projects such as the McCormick Place in Chicago. Lukosius also helped Chicago's Museum of Science and Industry raise $35 million to build an exhibition space for the U-505 submarine, which opened in 2005. His Silver Star medal is also an artifact held by the museum.

Lukosius died on August 12, 2006, at the age of 87.
