= Jesús José Berabe Campechano =

Mexican potter

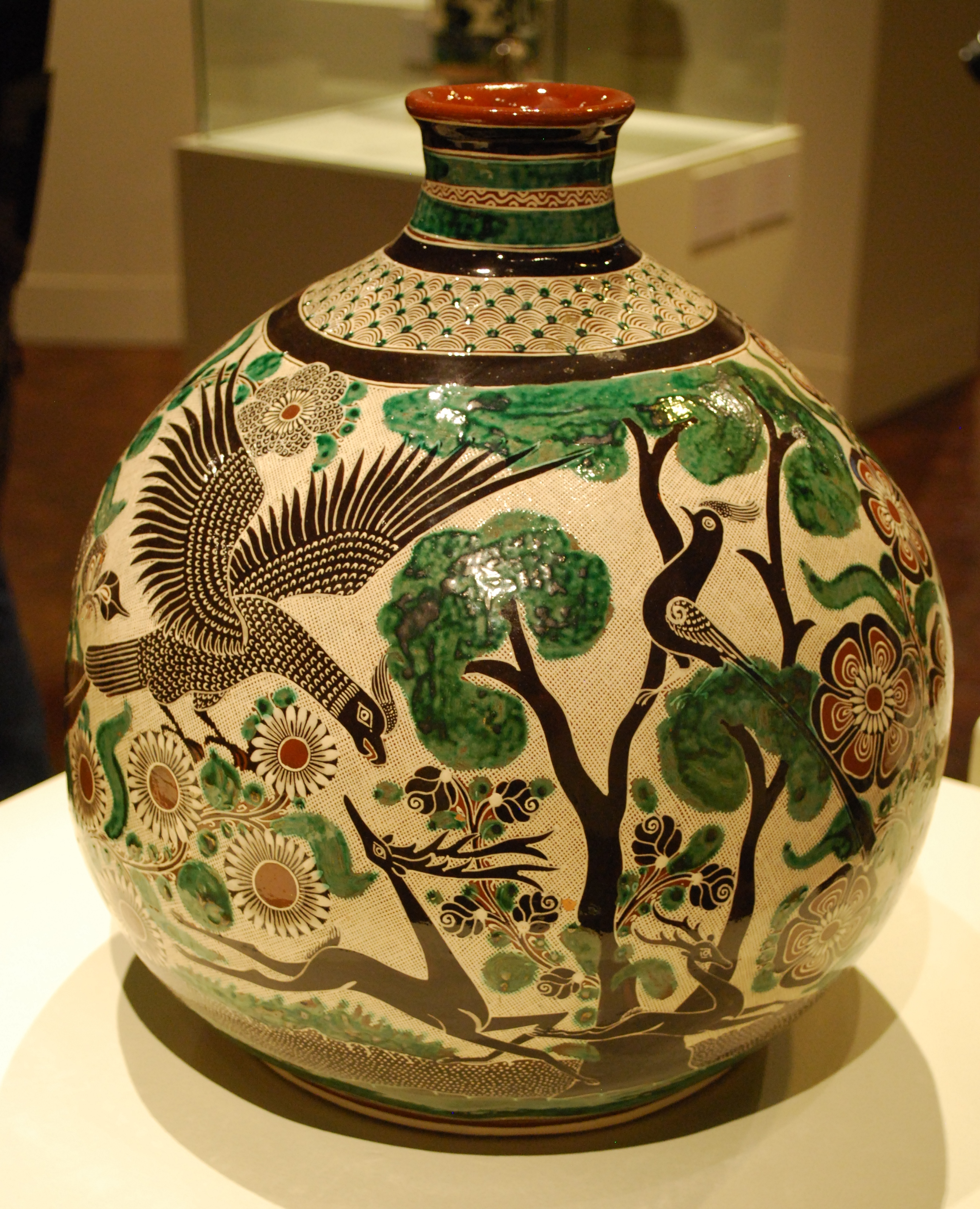
Round jar in barro petatillo by the artisan on display at the Museo de Arte Popular in Mexico City

Jesús José Bernabe Campechano is a fourth generation Mexican potter who is best known keeping the disappearing ceramic form of “petatillo” alive. He has won various awards for this work including the Galardon Angel Carranza of Mexico's National Ceramics Prize in 1989.

Bernabe Campechano has worked for over forty years in the ceramics town of Tonalá, Jalisco. He has created a number of traditional Jalisco ceramics, but is best known for his petatillo pieces. Petatillo ceramics are noted for their intricate designs, which place tiny crosshatches in the empty spaces among the larger design elements. This work is intricate and time-consuming, which has made it expensive and hard to find. His family began making this pottery in the mid 19th century, and the artisan has continued the tradition, teaching his children as well as others.

Bernabe Campechano continues to work in his workshop in Tonalá, along with his children. Their work is a combination of tradition and innovation. He uses white, black, beige and red clays as well as enamel paints for ceramics, some of which he prepares himself. Traditional colors include black, red and white, but the workshop has also experimented with other colors such as green and blue with success. His children have also experimented with high-fire ceramics.

His pieces are shaped both with molds and turntables. Slips and paints are made from mineral pigments and are applied using animal hair brushes, made at the workshop. Petatillo pieces are first colored red inside and out after drying. The major decorative images are first traced on the piece then filled in. The empty spaces that are left are filled in with tiny crosshatched lines, which gives the ceramic its name. The piece is fired for the first time, then glazed and fired again. Today the traditional glazes have been replaced with lead-free versions. Most of the petatillo pieces are bowls, vases, platters, soup tureens and water glasses.
