= Abich =

Abich is a surname. Notable people with the surname include:

- Hans Abich (1918–2003), German filmproducer
- Otto Wilhelm Hermann Abich (1806–1886), German mineralogist and geologist
