= Jesús Carranza Cortés =

Jesús Carranza Cortés is a Mexican potter from Tlaquepaque, Jalisco, noted for miniatures he creates in his small workshop there. These pieces are of people such as street vendors, farm workers in traditional attire, lovers, mariachis and more. Most are created in scenes that depict Mexico’s past.

His grandfather raised horses and taught him the basics of working with clay to create figures. He models the pieces by hand and then sets them to dry. Firing is done on a small comal (platter for cooking tortillas), which is covered by a clay bowl. After firing, the pieces are initially painted with homemade tempura paints, which leave a matte finish. The final touches of facial features are done with varnish or dark paint. Each piece is unique.

In 2001, the Fomento Cultural Banamex named him a “grand master”.”
