= Jorge Wilmot =

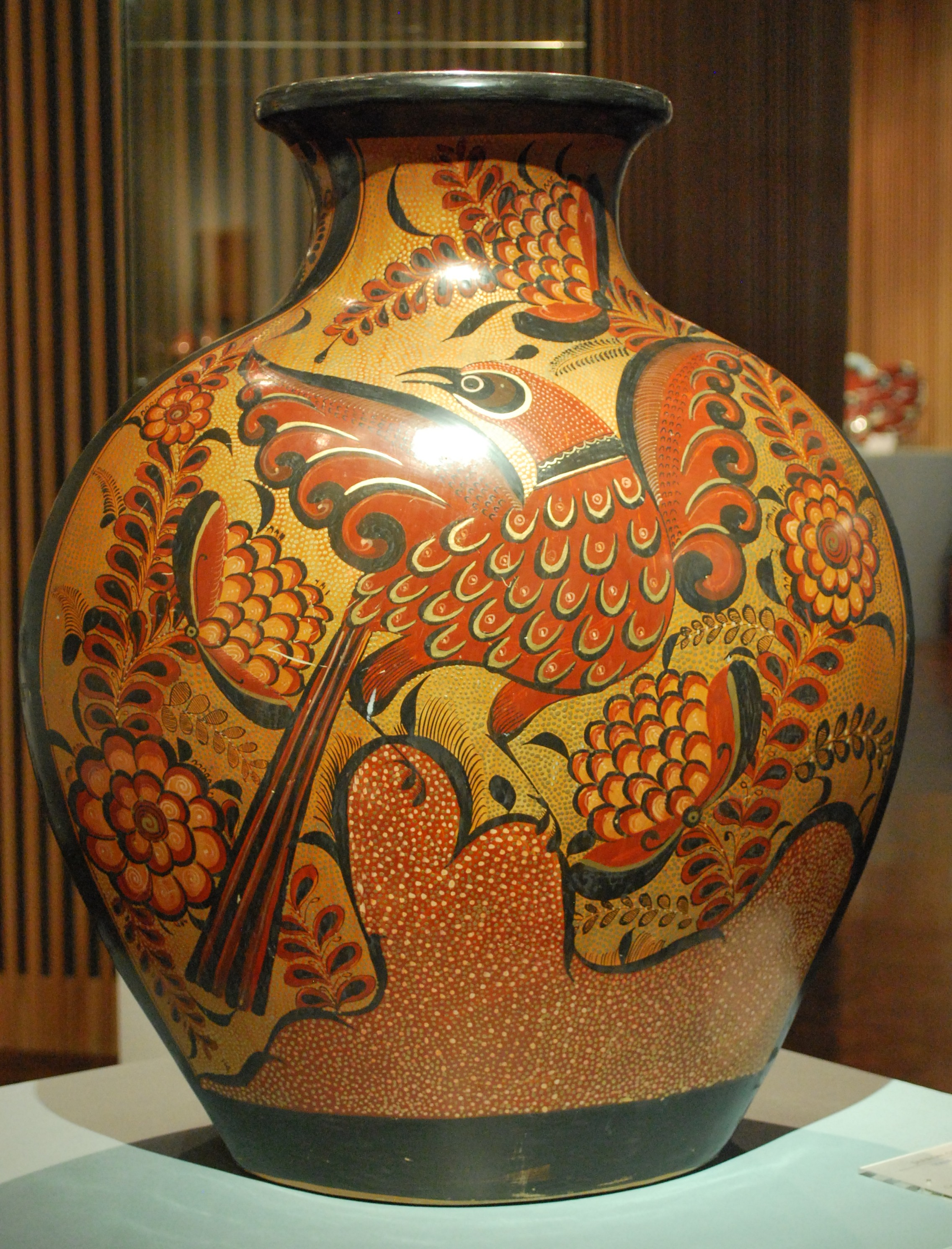
Bruñido jar on display at the Jorge Wilmot exhibition at the Museo de Arte Popular in Mexico City

Jorge Wilmot (1928 – January 12, 2012) was one of the most distinguished artisans of Mexico, and has been credited with the introduction of stoneware and other high fire techniques to the country. His work is also known for its more austere, Oriental-inspired designs blended with Mexican motifs. His work has been widely sold and exhibited both in Mexico and abroad and he has trained and influenced generations of ceramicists at the school he established in Tonalá, Jalisco.

== Biography ==
Wilmot was born in Monterrey, Nuevo León, in 1928. He began artistic studies at the Escuela de Artes Plásticas in the Academy of San Carlos in the early 1950s before going on to Europe. There he studied at the Instituto Franco-Italiano in Paris in 1953 and worked in Sweden with ceramicist Limberg Koge Londgren. He had further studies in Basel, Switzerland, in design at the trade school from 1953 to 1957.

Wilmot began working for the ceramics industry in Monterrey where he generated a number of innovations in technique and design. However, few firms kept Wilmot on after adapting his ideas. This eventually pushed him to relocate to Tonalá, Jalisco, by the 1960s to established his own workshop, studying the ceramics history and culture of western Mexico. In the 1960s, Wilmot held annual exhibits of his works at the Inés Amor Gallery, which brought him much attention. This led to his work being noticed and accepted abroad, which brought him wealth and fame.

Wilmot died on January 12, 2012, at the age of 83.

== Influence on technique and design of Mexican ceramics ==
Wilmot's two main contributions to Mexican ceramics were the introduction of high fire ceramics such as stoneware and blending of traditional Mexican designs and motifs with international and modern influences. He is quoted as saying “La cerámica de las artes es una de las más antiguas y a su vez de las más modernas” (Ceramics is one of the oldest and most modern art forms.) referring to the need to preserve tradition and modify it. Wilmot combined pre-Hispanic designs and motifs with modern elements as well as international influences, especially those from Asia. CONACULTA credits Wilmot with revolutionizing ceramics production in Mexico and establishing the production of high-fire wares, principally in Tonalá. He has been one of the forces behind Tonalá's current dominance in pottery and ceramics.

When Wilmot arrived to Tonalá in the 1960s, he felt that many Mexican ceramics were stuck in the past with no clear direction on how to adapt tradition to the modern world. He also felt that much of Mexico's ceramic production had degraded technically. Using his international experience as a base, Wilmot began to experiment with new ceramic forms, such as decorative objects and new methods of firing, being one of the first artisan ceramicists to use gas-fired kilns on a large scale. This facilitated the introduction of stoneware production techniques and the recreation of the native “bruñido” pottery but fired at high temperatures. Wilmot never considered himself an innovator but rather as someone who blended different influences. In addition, to high fire techniques, Wilmot also integrated Chinese crackled glazing (Jung Yao and Ko Yao) into a number of his pieces along with “celadon” and pale blue hues. His work is distinguished by his designs such as those of birds, flowers, two-headed eagles, lions and multicolored suns. Most of these are austere designs, a sign of Oriental influence rather than the more common Mexican tradition of adding profuse Baroque elements. His work has influenced ceramicists both in Mexico and abroad, with his works widely sold in Europe, Japan and the United States. In Mexico, so many of his innovations have been adopted by so many potters in the area that just about anything that departs from tradition shows Wilmot's influence

== Other activities ==
In addition to creating new and innovative ceramic pieces, Wilmot was involved with the production and promotion of traditional Mexican ceramics and other crafts. Since the 1960s, when he first established his workshop, he established a school for the purpose of improving the technical aspects of ceramics and pottery production as well as develop new design motifs. This school has produced new generations of artisans and is still operating. These graduates have established their own workshops in Jalisco and other Mexican states, spreading Wilmot's influence. However, none have been completely able to copy Wilmot's techniques, especially in glazing, exactly.

Another major effort by Wilmot was the establishment of the Museo Nacional de la Cerámica (National Ceramic Museum). Wilmot established the institution in his former home in Tonalá then donated it to the municipality. Director Prudencio Guzmán Rodríguez calls the museum “link between Tonalá’s tradition and people interested in researching our tradition.” Established in 1986, the museum has a collection of 1000 pieces of which range from pre-Hispanic artifacts to contemporary prizewinners. The institution's function is to promote the ceramic tradition in Mexico. Many of the artifacts are on loan from the Instituto Nacional Indigenista (National Indigenous Institute), and a number were donated by Wilmot himself. The rest of the pieces are prizewinners from the Certamen Estatal de la Cerámica (State Ceramic Contest).

By the mid-1990s, the museum had to close due to lack of funds and maintenance, but was reopened in 1996. The collection contains pieces created by some of the most renowned artisans of the area and is of the styles most typical to Tonalá such as bruñido, bandera, petatillo and canelo. Artists and artisans represented include Salvador Vásquez, Juan Antonio Mateo, Gerónimo Ramos, Nicasio Pajarito, Candelario Medrano, Jorge Wilmot and Ken Edwards.

Wilmot, along with Manuel Felguérez and other artists, founded the Saturday Art Market in San Ángel, Mexico City. In addition to ceramics, Wilmot also did design work for glass, painting, jewelry and other arts and crafts.

== Recognition ==
Wilmot has been the focus of individual exhibitions and participated in collective ones internationally since 1972, in countries such as France and Canada as well as his native Mexico. His awards include the Galardon Presidencial del IV Premio Nacional de la Ceramica de Tlaquepaque in 1982 and the Premio Nacional de Ciencias y Artes in 1995. Wilmot was deemed "Creator Emeritus" by the National System of Creators of Art (SNCA) in 1994 for his contribution to Mexico's cultural legacy as well as to the development of other generations of artists). In 1996 he won the Fomento Cultural Banamex prize and the Premio Nacional en Artes y Tradiciones.

In 2009 and 2010, a series of exhibitions in homage to Wilmot's work has been held in various parts of Mexico. The exhibitions are sponsored by the Museum of Popular Art (MAP) in Mexico City. Exhibitions have been held in Mexico City, for San Agustín Etla in Oaxaca, Guadalajara and Monterrey, sponsored by MAP and other entities. The exhibitions feature more than five decades' worth of Wilmot's pottery and ceramics as well as photographs, memorabilia and Wilmot's forays into other crafts such as glassmaking and jewelry design) . The exhibitions featured between 300 and 600 pieces which were brought together from various institutional and individual collections) .

== See also ==
Ceramics of Jalisco
