= Zenón Martínez García =

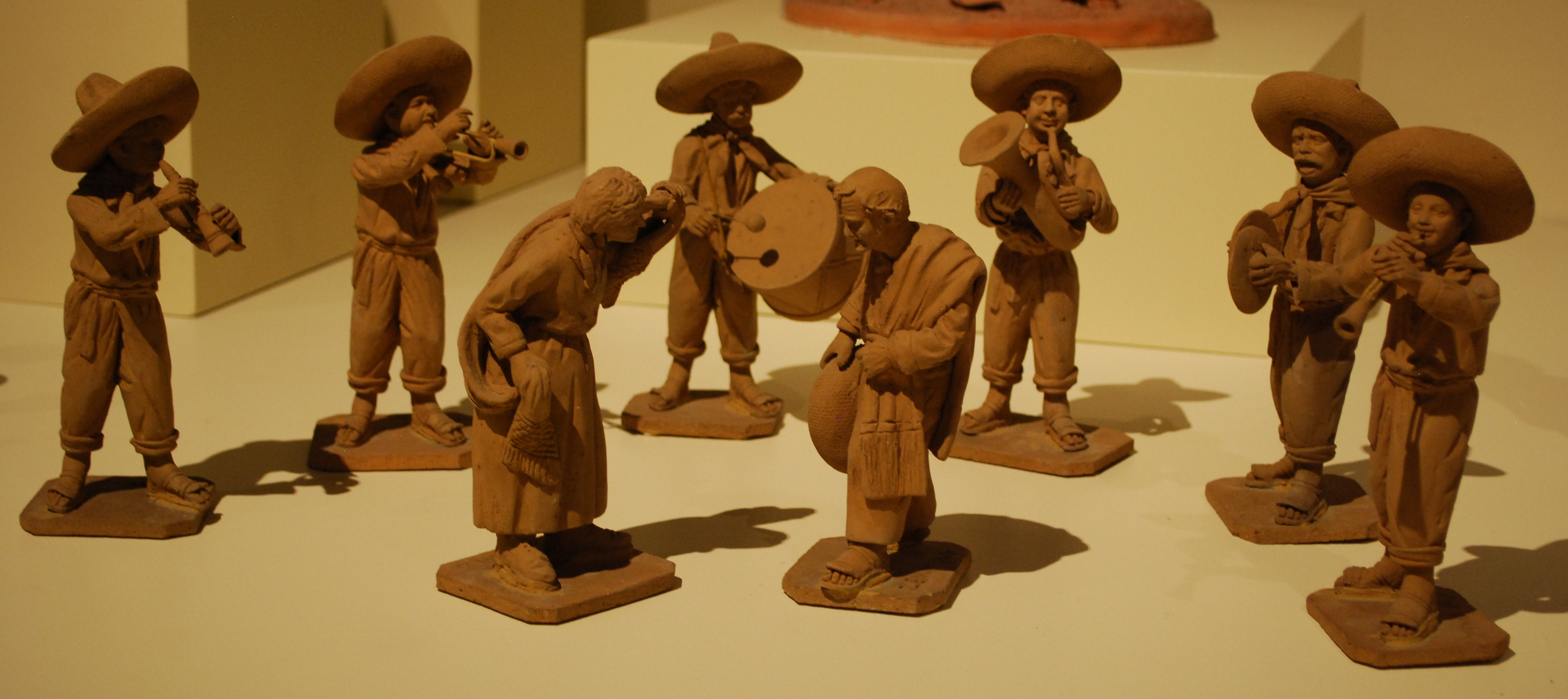
Figurines "Bodas de Oro" by Zenón Martinez Garcia on display at the Museo de Arte Popular in Mexico City

Zenón Martínez García (died 2010) was a Mexican potter from Tlaquepaque, Jalisco recognized for his figurines.

Martínez García’s work is distinguished by its realism along with expressive faces. His most notable work is that of nativity scenes. He created at least eighteen different basic sets, from the most traditional to Mexicanized versions in Chiapan, Huichol or Aztec dress or with the addition of charros, campesinos and more. He also made individual figures, also based on Mexican tradition, including bullfighters, men handling fighting roosters, street sellers, charcoal makers, and farmers.

He made his figures from a fine white clay, mixed with a sticky black, both locally obtained. Cleaning and mixing was all done by hand in his workshop, even stepping on batches of clay to eliminate air bubbles. The figures are shaped by hand, over a wire frame for support, each with slightly different face and expression. His paints consist of egg yolk, oil and water along with coloring agents, which has a mate finish. Certain elements such as eyes and hair were varnished to make them shine.

He mostly sold his wares in his hometown of Tlaquepaque, but spent the Christmas season in Mexico City, selling nativity scenes at the artisans’ fair in the Balbuena neighborhood.

Martínez García’s work has received numerous awards and other recognitions both in Tlaquepaque and in other parts of Mexico. He was named a “grand master” in 2001 by the Fomento Cultural Banamex.In 2006, he won the Galardón Ángel Carranza of the Premio Nacional de la Cerámica (National Ceramics Prize). He also received a posthumous recognition from the Comisión de Fomento Artesanal of the state of Jalisco in 2011.
