= Ceci Flores Armenta =

Mexican activist

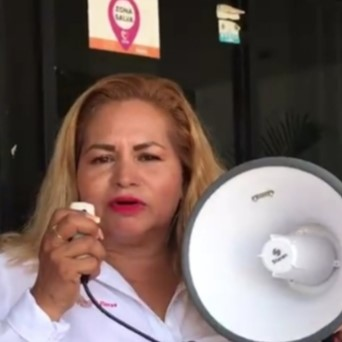
- Flores Armenta in June 2022
- Born: Cecilia Patricia Flores Armenta; 1972 or 1973; Los Mochis, Sinaloa, Mexico
- Occupation: Activist
- Known for: Founder of Madres Buscadoras de Sonora
- Children: 6

Cecilia Patricia Flores Armenta (born 1972 or 1973) is a Mexican madre buscadora (an activist responding to high rates of missing persons in Mexico) and the founder and leader of Madres Buscadoras de Sonora. In 2022, she was part of the BBC 100 Women.

== Life ==
Flores, originally from Los Mochis, Sinaloa, is a single mother to six children.

On October 30, 2015, one of Flores's sons, 21-year-old Alejandro Guadalupe, disappeared in Juan José Ríos, Sinaloa, while traveling to Los Mochis.

On May 4, 2019, two of Flores' other children, 32-year-old Marco Antonio and 15-year-old Jesús Adrián, were kidnapped in Bahía Kino, Sonora. She began using social media to advocate for their return, and was contacted by their kidnappers, who told Flores that her sons would be released at a specific place and time; however, only Jesús Adrián was returned. According to Flores, as of 2024 the authorities still have not opened an investigation into Marco Antonio's disappearance.

In May 2019, Flores established Madres Buscadoras de Sonora, a group which aims to find missing persons either alive or dead. Since the establishment of the collective in 2019, Flores has been joined by more than 900 other women from Sinaloa. The group has found multiple bodies.

In June 2021, Flores registered with the Protection Mechanism for Human Rights Defenders and Journalists of the Ministry of the Interior, and left Sonora due to the threats she had received. On October 11, 2021, Flores met with the Attorney General's Office to discuss the murder of Aranza Ramos, and the threats she had received. The same day, she announced that she would begin a hunger strike outside the Attorney General's Office, due to the lack of response after she reported several deaths threats made against her. On October 14, 2021, she met with Sonora Governor Alfonso Durazo to follow up on the reports of threats against her.

In May 2022, she announced an indefinite pause on her search for Alejandro Guadalupe, saying she feared for her life.

On the afternoon of 16 April 2023, Flores was reported missing while the group was carrying out a search in Ahome, Sinaloa. The media publicized her disappearance, and on the morning of 17 April, the president of Mexico, Andrés Manuel López Obrador, stated that an operation was underway to find Flores. That afternoon, Sinaloa Governor Rubén Rocha Moya announced she had been found safe, and was being transported to the city of Los Mochis. Flores later reported that the National Guard asked her daughter to wait 72 hours to file a missing persons report; however, Flores was already part of the protected persons program, which requires that members always be protected by security elements.

In May 2023, Flores reported the discovery of a body that could belong to one of her sons; the Prosecutor's Office later determined that they were not his remains. Flores continued to receive threats in 2023. In October 2023, Flores visited Washington, D.C., to be recognized at an American conference.

On 16 June 2024, Flores was reported missing again, but was recovered safely at a private home in Querétaro the following day.

Flores has written a memoir, Madre buscadora: crónica de la desesperación (ISBN 9786075939056), which was published through Fondo Blanco in December 2023. The work won the Cámara Nacional de la Industria Editorial Mexicana's 2024 award for the Best Non-fiction Book.

On 24 March 2026, she announced on social media that she had located a portion of Marco Antonio's remains on a highway near Hermosillo, Sonora. These findings were verified through DNA testing.

== Madres Buscadoras de Sonora ==
Madres Buscadoras de Sonora is a non-profit organization dedicated to searching for missing persons in the state of Sonora, and occasionally in other states. Flores founded the organization in 2019. Membership consists primarily of mothers with missing children, who aim to recover their children or at least their remains.

In the two years after their first search, the collective located more than 400 bodies in clandestine graves and found 139 people alive and reconnected them to families in different parts of the country.

== Recognition ==
- Participated in the second edition of the Las Mujeres del Sol forum (2020), organized by El Sol de Hermosillo.
- In June 2022, Forbes listed her among the "Five Most Powerful Mexican Women".
- BBC 100 Women (2022)
