= María del Carmen Morales =

Mexican human rights activist (1982–2025)

- Died: April 24, 2025; Santa Cruz del Valle, Tlajomulco de Zúñiga, Jalisco, Mexico
- Known for: Human rights activism

María del Carmen Morales (1982–2025) was a Mexican human rights activist. After her son Ernesto Julián was forcibly disappeared in 2024, Morales joined the Guerrero Buscadores de Jalisco, a community of madres buscadoras searching for their missing relatives in Jalisco. In 2025, Morales was murdered alongside her son Daniel while searching for Ernesto Julián.

== Activism ==
On 24 February 2024, Morales's son Ernesto Julián disappeared in Tlajomulco de Zúñiga, Jalisco, at the age of 19. On 1 March, she filed a criminal complaint with local police concerning his disappearance, and began looking for him. Morales joined the Guerrero Buscadores de Jalisco, a community of family members searching for relatives who had been subjected to enforced disappearances in the state of Jalisco. She took part in and also organised group searches, continuing to do so even after receiving a public death threat. After receiving a second death threat, Morales stopped participating in searches with the Guerrero Buscadores de Jalisco.

Weeks prior to her murder, the Guerrero Buscadores de Jalisco gained national prominence after exposing a recruitment camp in Teuchitlán operated by the Jalisco New Generation Cartel. Following this, the President of Mexico, Claudia Sheinbaum, had ordered meetings between various buscadores collectives and the Ministry of the Interior to address their concerns and to listen to their proposals for enacting laws against forced disappearances that would be presented to Congress.

== Murder ==
In the early hours of 24 April 2025, Morales and her son Jaime Daniel Ramírez Morales were carrying water in the Las Villas area of Santa Cruz del Valle in Tlajomulco de Zúñiga when two or three hooded men on motorcycles with number plates from Michoacán arrived and shot at them. Morales was reported to have been killed while trying to defend Daniel, who was also killed in the attack.

Following the murders of Morales and her son, the Guerrero Buscadores de Jalisco demanded an immediate and thorough investigation, calling for "no more violence and impunity in the state of Jalisco". They called on President Sheinbaum to put "pressure" on Jalisco authorities to take "concrete steps" to prevent violence and ensure justice for the Morales family.

Local authorities stated that the murders were not linked to Morales's status as a madre buscadora, and stated that it would "redouble efforts" to identify the killers.

Morales and her son became the 29th and 30th people searching for missing family members to be killed in Mexico since 2010.

== Response ==
Following the murders of Morales and her son, the Human Rights Committee of Nuevo Laredo suspended its search activities and its meetings with the Mexican government, stating that the killings represented a message from cartels towards buscadores groups that did not receive personal security from either the federal or state governments.

Rosa Icela Rodríguez, the Secretary of the Interior, condemned the murders and expressed her condolences to the Morales family. During a meeting with buscadores, she held a minute silence. Mari Isabel Cruz Bernal, a madre buscadora at the meeting, called on her fellow buscadores to "continue searching for their children, until they find them".

Pablo Lemus Navarro, the governor of Jalisco, expressed his condolences and reaffirmed that all buscadores had the "support and backing of the government of Jalisco", vowing to end impunity for perpetrators of violence in the state.

Claudia Sheinbaum described the murders as "deeply regrettable" and stated that a thorough investigation would take time.

Days after the murders, the Attorney General's Office of the State of Jalisco confirmed that it had arrested two suspects, identified as 27-year-old Juan Manuel N. and 24-year-old José Luis N., in Tlajomulco de Zúñiga. It was reported that the men had been linked to 10 other murders.

== See also ==
- Teresa González Murillo, a fellow madre buscadora murdered three weeks before del Carmen Morales.
