= Tlajomulco de Zúñiga bombing =

- Part of Mexican drug war
- Location: Tlajomulco de Zúñiga, Jalisco, Mexico
- Date: July 11, 2023; 22:00
- Target: Mexican police
- Attack type: Bombing
- Deaths: 6
- Injuries: 15
- Perpetrator: Jalisco New Generation Cartel (suspected)
- Accused: 5

On July 11, 2023, a bombing in Tlajomulco de Zúñiga, Jalisco, Mexico, killed six people and injured twelve others. The bombing targeted police and local authorities responding to a call reporting dead bodies.

== Background ==
Bombings by cartels against Mexican authorities are uncommon, but have occurred in recent years. Two weeks prior to the Tlajomulco attack, a bomb-ridden phone killed four Mexican National Guard soldiers in Celaya, Guanajuato. Jalisco is the main base of operations for the Jalisco New Generation Cartel (CJNG), one of the largest and deadliest cartels in Mexico.

== Bombing ==
The bombing took place at a property on Flaviano Ramos Norte Street in El Tinaco, a more rural area in Tlajomulco de Zúñiga, a suburb of Guadalajara. Mexican authorities responded to a call about the discovery of bodies at a rural plot of land. The caller was a member of the mothers' collectives, who search for remains of those killed by cartels. When police arrived on scene at about 10pm, seven bombs blew up and the car carrying the authorities was attacked. Jalisco governor Enrique Alfaro Ramírez said that the "call was so our police would go there and could be attacked with these explosive devices."

Six people were killed and fifteen were injured in the bombing. Three of the dead were workers at the attorney general's office, one was a police officer, and two were civilians. One of the injured civilians lost an eye.

== Aftermath ==
Following the attack, Governor Alfaro suspended the state's dispatching of officers to review sites of missing people input by anonymous people. He also said that the Mexican army would be deployed to the area to prevent further attacks. Two people were arrested in connection with the attacks on July 18. No group has claimed responsibility or been accused of the attacks, but CJNG is suspected. Three more people were arrested in connection with the attacks a few weeks later.
