= 12th federal electoral district of Jalisco =

Federal electoral district of Mexico

Jalisco's 12th
- Electoral district of the Chamber of Deputies of Mexico

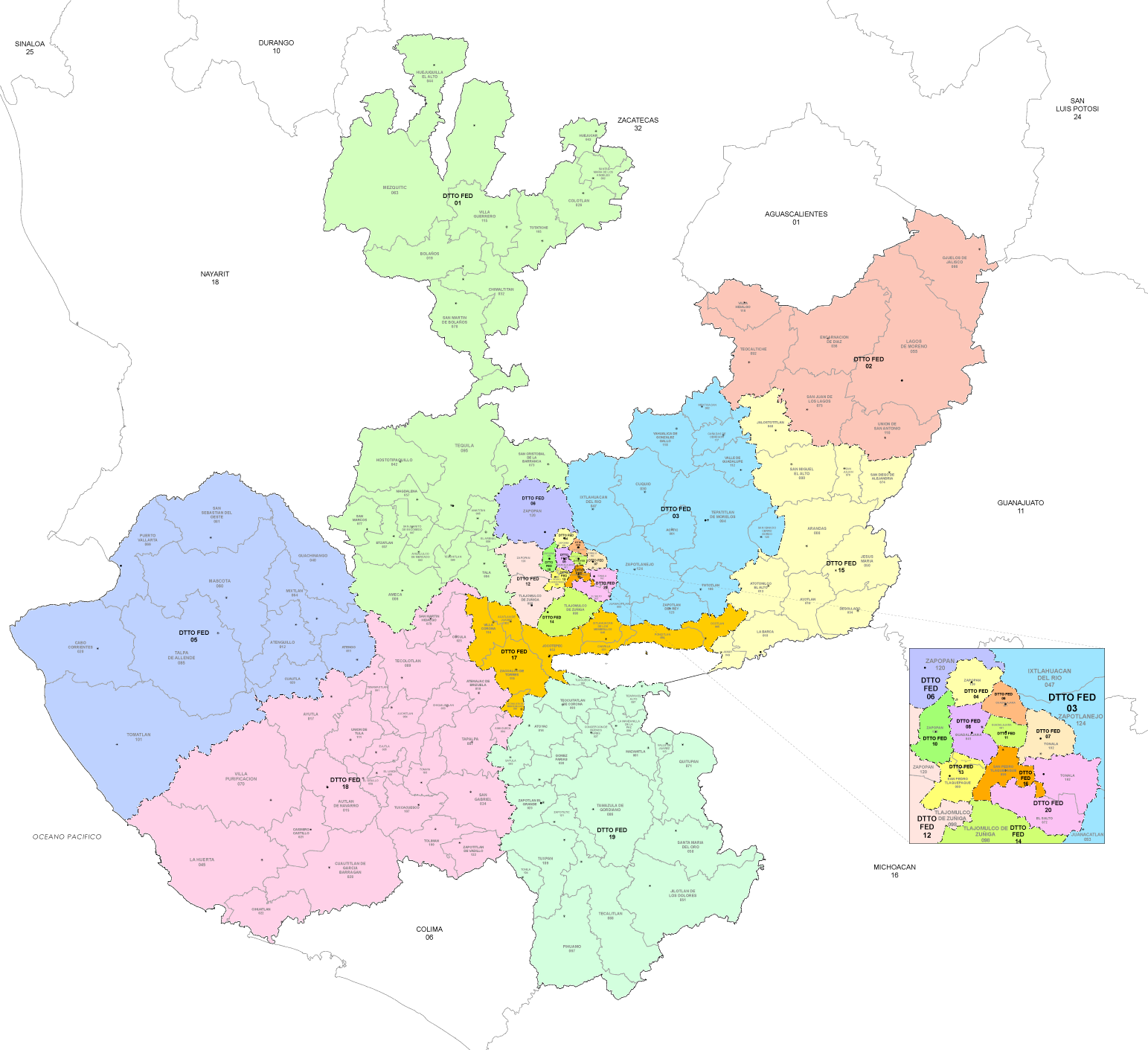
- 12th district

Incumbent
- Member: Sandra González Pérez
- Party: ▌Morena
- Congress: 66th (2024–2027)

District
- State: Jalisco
- Head town: Santa Cruz de las Flores
- Coordinates: 20°29′N 103°30′W
- Covers: Tlajomulco de Zúñiga (part), Zapopan (part)
- PR region: First
- Precincts: 120
- Population: 441,598 (2020 census)

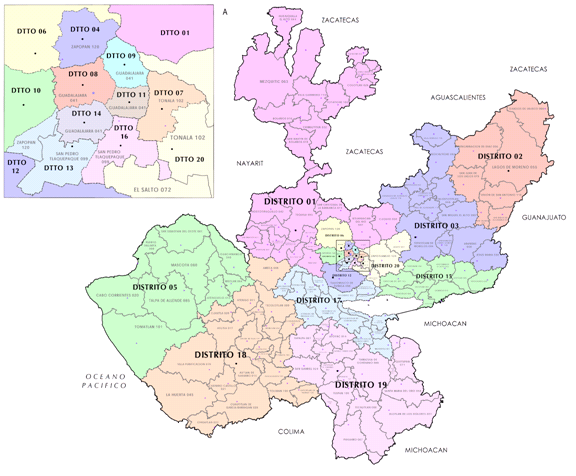
Jalisco's districts in 2017–2022

The 12th federal electoral district of Jalisco (Spanish: Distrito electoral federal 12 de Jalisco) is one of the 300 electoral districts into which Mexico is divided for elections to the federal Chamber of Deputies and one of 20 such districts in the state of Jalisco.

It elects one deputy to the lower house of Congress for each three-year legislative session by means of the first-past-the-post system. Votes cast in the district also count towards the calculation of proportional representation ("plurinominal") deputies elected from the first region.

The current member for the district, elected in the 2024 general election, is Sandra Beatriz González Pérez of the National Regeneration Movement (Morena).

== District territory ==
Under the 2023 districting plan adopted by the National Electoral Institute (INE), which is to be used for the 2024, 2027 and 2030 federal elections, Jalisco's 12th district covers parts of two of the state's 125 municipalities:

- 75 electoral precincts (secciones electorales) in Tlajomulco de Zúñiga and 45 precincts in Zapopan. (Note: The 4th, 6th and 10th districts cover the remainder of Zapopan, while the rest of Tlajomulco is assigned to the 14th district.)

The head town (cabecera distrital), where results from individual polling stations are gathered together and tallied, is the city of Santa Cruz de las Flores in Tlajomulco. The district reported a population of 441,598 in the 2020 census.

== Previous districting schemes ==
Evolution of electoral district numbers
	1974	1978	1996	2005	2017	2023
Jalisco	13	20	19	19	20	20
Chamber of Deputies	196	300				

2017–2022

Jalisco regained its 20th congressional seat in the 2017 redistricting process. The 12th district's head town was at Santa Cruz de las Flores and it covered the 129 precincts that made up the municipality of Tlajomulco.

2005–2017

Under the 2005 plan, Jalisco had 19 districts. This district's head town was at Tlajomulco and it covered 35 precincts in that municipality, 41 precincts in the municipality of Tlaquepaque, and the whole of El Salto.

1996–2005

In the 1996 scheme, under which Jalisco lost a single-member seat, the district covered 186 precincts in the west of the municipality of Guadalajara.

1978–1996

The districting scheme in force from 1978 to 1996 was the result of the 1977 electoral reforms, which increased the number of single-member seats in the Chamber of Deputies from 196 to 300. Under that plan, Jalisco's seat allocation rose from 13 to 20. The 12th district's head town was at Ameca and it covered a number of municipalities in the west of the state, including Puerto Vallarta, San Martín de Hidalgo, San Marcos and San Sebastián.

== Deputies returned to Congress ==
(Mexico) National parties
- Current
- PAN
- PRI
- PT
- PVEM
- MC
- Morena
- PAZ
- Somos
- Defunct or local only
- PLM
- PNR
- PRM
- PNM
- PP
- PPS
- PARM
- PFCRN
- CON
- PANAL
- PSD
- PES
- PES
- PRD

Jalisco's 12th district
Election	Deputy	Party	Term	Legislature
1916	José I. Solórzano		1916–1917	Constituent Congress of Querétaro
...
1976	Rafael González Pimienta	Institutional Revolutionary Party	1976–1979	50th Congress
1979	Luis R. Casillas Rodríguez	Institutional Revolutionary Party	1979–1982	51st Congress
1982	Aidé Heréndira Villalobos Rivera	Institutional Revolutionary Party	1982–1985	52nd Congress
1985	Francisco García Castellón	Institutional Revolutionary Party	1985–1988	53rd Congress
1988	Ramiro Hernández García	Institutional Revolutionary Party	1988–1991	54th Congress
1991	Rafael González Pimienta	Institutional Revolutionary Party	1991–1994	55th Congress
1994	Rodolfo González Macías	Institutional Revolutionary Party	1994–1997	56th Congress
1997	Gustavo Espinosa Plata	National Action Party (Mexico)	1997–2000	57th Congress
2000	Miguel Ángel Martínez Cruz	National Action Party (Mexico)	2000–2003	58th Congress
2003	Sergio Vázquez García	National Action Party (Mexico)	2003–2006	59th Congress
2006	Mario Eduardo Moreno Álvarez	National Action Party (Mexico)	2006–2009	60th Congress
2009	Joel González Díaz	Institutional Revolutionary Party	2009–2012	61st Congress
2012	Celia Isabel Gauna Ruiz de León	Institutional Revolutionary Party	2012–2015	62nd Congress
2015	Salvador Zamora Zamora	Citizens' Movement (Mexico)	2015–2018	63rd Congress
2018	Adriana Gabriela Medina Ortiz	Citizens' Movement (Mexico)	2018–2021	64th Congress
2021	María Asención Álvarez Solís	Citizens' Movement (Mexico)	2021–2024	65th Congress
2024	Sandra Beatriz González Pérez	National Regeneration Movement	2024–2027	66th Congress

== Presidential elections ==
Jalisco's 12th district
Election	District won by	Party or coalition	%
2018	Andrés Manuel López Obrador	Juntos Haremos Historia	47.3997
2024	Bertha Xóchitl Gálvez Ruiz	Fuerza y Corazón por México	43.8088
