= 2026 FIFA World Cup fans and media controversies =

The 2026 FIFA World Cup was accompanied by a number of controversies mostly relating to FIFA ticket pricing, political, logistical, environmental, and human rights issues across its three host nations—the United States, Mexico, and Canada. It has been described as the most controversial World Cup. Many venues were criticized for inadequate public transit access. Mandatory hydration breaks introduced in response to extreme heat concerns became a source of criticism after broadcasters used them to air commercials. Environmental groups projected the expanded 48-team tournament to be among the most carbon-intensive in World Cup history. Additional concerns included labor disputes at SoFi Stadium, security and infrastructure issues in all three host nations, unrest related to drug cartels in Guadalajara, cost overruns in Canadian host cities, and the restriction of the Spanish language at official press conferences, despite Spanish being one of FIFA's seven official languages and the primary language of co-host Mexico.

== Attack on buses in New York City by Knicks fans ==
Following the New York Knicks winning the 2026 NBA Finals on June 13, 2026, fans of the team attacked shuttle buses transporting spectators from MetLife Stadium following the Brazil vs Morocco match. Knicks fans forced nine shuttle buses to be abandoned, and destroyed five, with one bus being set on fire. No reports of injuries to spectators were reported.

== Clashes between Argentine and Algerian supporters ==
On June 16, clashes broke out between supporters of Argentina and Algeria in New York City's Times Square ahead of the teams' opening match. Videos circulating on social media showed groups of fans exchanging punches and kicks before police intervened to restore order. According to the New York City Police Department, one person was taken into custody and issued a summons for disorderly conduct, while no injuries were reported. The incident was widely reported as one of the first major episodes of fan violence during the tournament.

== Criticism of photographers' positioning during national anthems ==
Several national team managers criticised the positioning of photographers during national anthems at matches. England manager Thomas Tuchel said that the number of photographers placed in front of the benches prevented him from seeing his players during the anthem, while Germany manager Julian Nagelsmann also criticised their proximity, joking that he felt as though the photographers were "taking pictures of the hairs in my nose". Both managers called on FIFA to reconsider the placement of photographers during pre-match ceremonies. Due to the complaints, FIFA agreed to move the positions of the photographers for all subsequent pre-match national anthem performances.

== Cristiano Ronaldo social media controversy ==
Portugal captain Cristiano Ronaldo ignited a social media controversy following the World Cup final, after screenshots circulated showing his verified Instagram account "liking" a Spanish media video from Espejo público that accused FIFA of systemic corruption and favoritism towards Lionel Messi and the Argentina national team.

== Alleged hate campaign against Argentina ==
Argentine media reported that an online hate campaign was waged against their national team during the World Cup. Allegedly started by paid accounts based in Russia, it quickly snowballed after the round of 16, leading to cases of harassment of Argentinians living in Spain in the days before the final and even cases of assault.

Some of the celebrities that helped spread this campaign in social media later apologized, clarifying that their comments were motivated by the actions of the current Argentine administration, rather than against the nation as a whole.

== Uruguay coach media incidents ==
Uruguay manager Marcelo Bielsa was involved in two media-related incidents during the tournament. The first came during his official FIFA photoshoot, where his portrait showing him with his head bowed and eyes downcast drew attention and criticism on social media. Bielsa responded by stating he was "no model" and did not need to justify the pose, adding that there was nothing unusual about wearing glasses or looking down. The second occurred after Uruguay's elimination against Spain, when Bielsa was filmed becoming frustrated while waiting for a live post-match TV interview. Reports stated the delay was caused by brief camera setup adjustments, during which he reportedly shouted "¡Dale de una vez!" ("Hurry up") before the interview began. He later apologized for his reaction and for the earlier photoshoot controversy, describing his conduct as inappropriate and driven by frustration.

== Fan behavior in Mexico ==
Across Mexico, in the wake of the national team's ongoing successful World Cup campaign, there were reports of fans shaking vehicles, and on several occasions drivers accelerated and ran over fans, injuring several people. On June 24, in Cabo San Lucas, Baja California Sur, a driver who was traveling with his family ran over 17 people after his vehicle was shaken. As he attempted to flee, he crashed the vehicle and was subsequently attacked by the fans. The driver died in the hospital from serious injuries he sustained in the incident a week later.

It was reported that fans had left large amounts of trash in the streets of Mexico. Along Paseo de la Reforma in Mexico City, a common gathering place for celebrations due to the Angel of Independence monument, damage was reported to the avenue's greenery. Bus shelters along Line 7 of the Metrobús, which ran along the avenue, were also damaged. Several fans were photographed urinating on posters of missing persons at the Glorieta de las y los Desaparecidos. A group of Mexican fans verbally harassed madres buscadoras, assaulted a journalist defending them, and, during rain-soaked celebrations, used banners bearing photographs of missing persons to shield themselves from the rain.

=== Mexico vs Czech Republic ===
During Mexico's group stage match against the Czech Republic on June 24, Mexican fans reportedly chanted ¡puto!, a homophobic refrain that had caused problems for the team and the federation over the past 25 years, and had previously resulted in fines and partial stadium closures.

=== Mexico vs Ecuador ===
Ahead of Mexico's round of 32 encounter against Ecuador, Mexican fans gathered outside Ecuador's team hotel in Mexico City during the night and used horns, loudspeakers, and motorcycles in an attempt to disturb the players' sleep before the match. The tactic, known as a "hotel serenade", is a controversial but common tradition in Latin American soccer, often used to disrupt visiting teams' preparation. In response, the Ecuadorian Football Federation filed a formal complaint with World Cup organizers, stating that the behavior went against principles of fair play and affected player recovery and preparation. Ecuador also faced a difficult arrival in Mexico City, with travel delays, a long transfer from the airport, and heavy traffic adding to the disruption before the match. Following the match, Ecuadorian journalists from Teleamazonas reported being targeted by Mexican supporters in the stands while broadcasting live from the Estadio Azteca. Journalist José Carlos Crespo was struck in the face by a cup of beer after supporters allegedly threw objects toward the press area despite repeated requests for police intervention. After Mexico's victory in the match, four people reportedly died during celebrations in Mexico City in the early morning hours of July 1, three of them from asphyxiation.

=== Mexico vs England ===
Ahead of England's round of 16 match against Mexico, the English camp took additional precautions during their stay in Mexico City amid concerns that they could be subjected to similar disturbances seen in Mexico's match against Ecuador. To minimize any disruption, England kept the location of their hotel confidential where possible, and provided players and staff with sleep aids, including earplugs, sleep bands, natural remedies, and white noise machines. Due to the multiple deaths attributed to the poor civil protection measures observed during the match against Ecuador, in which more than one million people gathered along Paseo de la Reforma, the Mexico City government increased the installation of more television screens along Paseo de la Reforma, as well as on the adjacent Avenida de los Insurgentes and Avenida Chapultepec; increased the number of police officers; limited the access to the Angel of Independence roundabout; restricted access to areas with high concentrations of people; and restricted the sale of alcoholic beverages. The nearby metro stations Chapultepec, Sevilla, and Insurgentes were also closed. In Guadalajara and Monterrey, similar measures were applied.

England's preparations were disrupted by heavy crowd presence outside their Mexico City hotel, where supporters gathered on arrival and police and National Guard units were deployed to maintain security. England were reportedly met with boos and chants as the team arrived, reflecting heightened tension around visiting teams in the city. Preparations were further complicated when FIFA briefly considered moving the kick-off time due to a forecast of severe weather, a proposal that was later dropped after objections from both the English Football Association and the Mexican Football Federation. The fixture ultimately remained scheduled as originally planned, but the uncertainty added to a disrupted build-up. Heavy overnight "serenades" outside the England hotel saw supporters using horns, loudspeakers, and fireworks in an attempt to disturb the team's sleep, despite a significant police presence. The England team bus was also sprayed with foam by fans on arrival at the stadium, before the match was ultimately delayed by approximately one hour due to severe weather conditions.

== Croatia fan reactions to disallowed goal ==
After Croatia's stoppage-time equaliser against Portugal in the round of 32 was disallowed following a lengthy VAR check, Croatian fans, who were concentrated on the south end of the Toronto Stadium where the would-be tying goal crossed the line, started throwing plastic bottles and other debris onto the pitch, delaying the restart of the game. The fans booed as players from both teams helped remove the objects from the field.

== Moroccan fan assaulted in Lille ==
On July 6 in Lille, France, a Moroccan woman wearing a Morocco national team shirt was assaulted by local youths. The incident occurred during street celebrations following Morocco's victory over Canada.

== German fan assaulted in Toronto ==
On June 20, Alex Alber, a German national visiting for the World Cup, was attacked by a group of young men at a popular bar in downtown Toronto. The attack left Alber’s German jersey stained with blood, and he was taken to a nearby hospital where he received stitches. According to Alber, the confrontation started when one of the men asked him about a rainbow-colored fan he was holding, prompting concerns about whether the attack was motivated by homophobia.

== Swedish fan killed at Copenhagen fan zone ==
On June 30, Christian Zedig, a 32-year-old Swedish citizen and off-duty officer of the Swedish Police Authority, was fatally assaulted at a World Cup fan zone in Copenhagen's Islands Brygge district, where a crowd had gathered to watch the round of 32 match between Norway and the Ivory Coast on a public screen, ahead of Sweden's own match against France later that evening. According to Danish prosecutors, an altercation broke out during a goal celebration, during which Zedig was punched and suffered severe injuries; he later died in a hospital.

A suspect in his 30s surrendered to Copenhagen Police on July 3 after authorities released his photograph and appealed for information; he was remanded in custody for 26 days pending investigation and denied wrongdoing. The killing prompted expressions of condolence from Swedish Prime Minister Ulf Kristersson and from Zedig's colleagues in the Höglandet police district, where a memorial gathering was held. Copenhagen's mayor for children and youth, Jakob Næsager, called for public World Cup screenings at Islands Brygge to be cancelled following the attack.

== Argentina fans threw beer at Egypt fans ==
During Argentina's round of 16 match against Egypt, after Argentinian player Lionel Messi leveled the score in the 83rd minute, Argentina fans reportedly began hurling beer and taunting Egypt fans. Videos uploaded onto social media platforms showed fans telling supporters of Egypt to "Go. Go. Go. Dale. Arriba. (Come on. Get up.)" after the final whistle.

== Fan brawl at National Mall ==
On July 6, during the United States' match against Belgium, a large fight broke out at the designated FIFA "Fan Zone" at the National Mall in Washington, D.C. According to a video filmed by a news crew, the fight started as an argument between two people "before more spectators joined in and began throwing water bottles." The United States Park Police said that one person was escorted from the venue. No information about possible injuries related to the altercation was released.

== Assault of Toronto Police Officers ==
During the June 12 match between Canada and Bosnia and Herzegovina, two German nationals sitting in the Bosnia and Herzegovina fan section were arrested after two Toronto Police Service officers had objects thrown at them while responding to an altercation between fans in the section. The two German nationals, 25-year-old Emir Colic and 27-year-old Eldar Grabovac, were both charged with assault of a peace officer, and both officers were treated for minor injuries.

== Riots in Europe after Morocco defeat ==
After Morocco lost their quarterfinal match against France, there were reports of riots and other crime in several European cities. In London, England, there were clashes between crowds, resulting in police officers getting injured. Most of the unrest in London occurred near Edgware Road, an area of the city with a large Muslim population. Supporters were reported to be disrupting traffic and surrounded officers sent to the area. In footage shared on social media, there was “flares, thick smoke, objects being thrown, and riot police units advancing with shields between police vehicles.” One Metropolitan Police officer was reported to have suffered head injuries and had to be hospitalised after being struck with a glass bottle. The British Police reported that at least four people had been arrested relating to these incidents.

More disorder was reported in Düsseldorf, Germany, where it was reported that about 1,500 Morocco supporters had gathered near the central railway station. According to police, the atmosphere was initially peaceful but later turned aggressive. Three police officers were injured after fans threw firecrackers and glass bottles at them. Two men were arrested and several criminal investigations were opened. Disorder was also reported in the Netherlands, where riot police were deployed to Amsterdam, Rotterdam, and The Hague, after Morocco supporters remained in the streets following their country’s defeat. In Amsterdam, eight people were arrested for “public order offences” including one man who reportedly threw a brick at a police officer. In The Hague, fans threw bottles and pyrotechnics at officers. Moroccan fans in the Netherlands were also reported to have been chanting antisemitic and homophobic slogans after the match.

== Falkland Islands/Islas Malvinas banner post-match ==
After Argentina beat England 2–1 in the semifinals, Argentine players were shown displaying a banner stating that "Las Malvinas Son Argentinas" ("The Falklands Are Argentine"), referencing the Falkland Islands sovereignty dispute. Ed Davey, leader of the United Kingdom's Liberal Democrats, called for the players in question to be banned, comparing it to an incident when Spanish players had been banned by UEFA after chants about Gibraltar following the Euro 2024 final. FIFA had previously, in 2014, fined the Argentine Football Association 30,000 Swiss francs for displaying a similar banner before a friendly match.

== Riots in Buenos Aires after the World Cup final ==
After Argentina's loss to Spain in the World Cup final, fans gathered at the Obelisk of Buenos Aires to support the team, though celebrations were marred by riots in which supporters threw stones, glass bottles, and other objects at police, who used water cannons, tear gas, and rubber bullets. At least fifteen people were arrested by the Argentine Federal Police, with dozens of bystanders injured.
