= Salvatierra mass graves =

- Part of Mexican drug war
- Location: Salvatierra, Guanajuato, Mexico
- Date: October 20, 2020 (discovery)
- Deaths: 79
- Perpetrator: Unknown

On October 20, 2020, mass graves containing at least seventy-nine bodies was found in a neighborhood of Salvatierra, Guanajuato, Mexico. The discovery was the largest mass grave ever discovered in Guanajuato.

== Background ==
In 2020, Salvatierra was the site of a conflict between the Jalisco New Generation Cartel (CJNG) and Santa Rosa de Lima Cartel, like many of cities in Guanajuato. In Irapuato, cartel members shot and killed thirty-eight people in two massacres in June and July. Forty percent of all mass graves discovered in Mexico that year were concentrated in the state.

== Mass graves ==
The graves were discovered in a vacant lot inside the town of Salvatierra, whereas most mass graves are often discovered in the rural countryside. The lot was situated next to the Lerma River and a slaughterhouse, with a park across the river. The first indication there may be mass graves in the area came from a tip from local residents searching for missing relatives. Karla Quintana, the head of the National Search Commission stated that because the location was in a neighborhood, "the people [had to have] known]" that there were graves being dug.

The search for the bodies began on October 20 and was spurred by the Mariposas Destellando Corazones organization, with Mexican National Guard elements and Mexican Army soldiers keeping watch while coroners exhumed the sites. Quintana announced the discovery of the graves at fifty-two sites on the lot on October 29, along with the discovery of fifty-nine bodies exhumed and that there were still more bodies untouched. The bodies were buried between seventy centimenters and one meter deep. Residents of Salvatierra and other areas of Guanajuato who had missing relatives lined up around the site to see if they could recognize their relatives among the graves. Authorities encouraged the onlookers to take DNA tests and submit them to the government so the bodies could be identified.

On November 4, Quintana and the National Search Commission stated that the number of bodies found had risen to sixty-seven, sixty-six of which were discovered in mass graves located in Salvatierra. Of the sixty-seven, fifty bodies had been identified. This number increased to seventy-six bodies on November 8, and sixty-five graves with seventy-nine bodies by December.

== Reactions ==
The Salvatierra City Council demanded on January 9, 2021, that the Mexican government investigate the perpetrator of the killings and for action to be taken against the killers.

In October, Mexican president Andrés Manuel López Obrador expressed his condolences and deployed the National Guard to the area.
