= Extermination camp (disambiguation) =

"Extermination camp" is most commonly used to describe the Nazi extermination camps. However, it has also been used to describe other forms of internment or concentration camp where the activities at the camps have centered on torture and execution.

== World War II ==
During World War II, alongside the six main Nazi-run concentration camps in Central Europe, there were also major extermination camps run by the Nazis in allied states or run by collaborator regimes. These included:

- Jasenovac concentration camp, operated by the Independent State of Croatia
- Sajmište concentration camp, operated by the Nazis in Serbia
- Maly Trostenets extermination camp, operated by the Nazis in Belarus

== Post-World War II ==
Post-World War II, other concentration camps or internment facilities have been identified as extermination camps, including:

- Tuol Sleng prison, operated by the Khmer Rouge in Cambodia
- Jalisco extermination camp, operated by the Jalisco cartel in Mexico

== Early 20th century ==
Also, existing before the World War II period:

- Shark Island concentration camp, operated by the German empire in Namibia
