= Joel González =

Joel González may refer to:

- Joel González (taekwondo) (born 1989), Spanish taekwondo practitioner
- Joel González (futsal player) (born 1994), Argentine-Chilean futsal player
- Joel González Díaz (born 1965), Mexican politician
