= Santa Cruz de las Flores =

Santa Cruz de las Flores is Spanish for "holy cross of the flowers", and may refer to:

- Santa Cruz de las Flores, San Martín de Hidalgo, Jalisco
- Santa Cruz de las Flores, Tlajomulco de Zúñiga, Jalisco
