= Teresa Magueyal =

Mexican human rights activist (1958–2023)

Teresa Magueyal Ramírez (Note: In this Spanish name, the first or paternal surname is Magueyal and the second or maternal family name is Ramírez.) (1958 – 2 May 2023), also known as Doña Tere, was a Mexican human rights activist and madre buscadora. Following the disappearance of her son José Luis, she became a member of the collective Una Promesa por Cumplir, composed of the families of missing people in the state of Guanajuato searching for their relatives.

== Activism ==
On 6 April 2020, Magueyal's 31-year-old son, José Luis Apaseo Magueyal, disappeared in Celaya, Guanajuato, while travelling to a shop to purchase food for his family. Following this, Magueyal joined Una Promesa por Cumplir (lit. 'A Promise to be Kept'), a Celaya-based collective comprising 70 families of disappeared people in the Bajío region. The collective conducted its own investigations into disappearances, citing the ineffective response from local authorities. Guanajuato, which contains territory disputed by several cartels, has seen over 3,000 people disappear since 2019.

== Death ==
On 2 May 2023, Magueyal was shot dead by two men on a motorbike while riding her bike near her home in San Miguel Octopan, Celaya. She was the sixth member of Una Promesa por Cumplir to be killed since 2021, and the sixth family searcher to be killed in Guanajuato since 2020. An investigation into her killing was opened by the State Search Commission of Guanajuato. One person was arrested in relation to Magueyal's death.

== Response ==
Front Line Defenders expressed its concern at violence against female human rights activists, and criticised Mexican authorities for a lack of protection for human rights activists and for facilitating a "climate of impunity" for perpetrators.

Una Promesa por Cumplir described Magueyal as "such a loved person in the collective". It condemned her killing and called for justice, and stated it would continue her search for her missing son.

The deputy representative of the United Nations High Commissioner for Human Rights in Mexico City, Jesús Peña Palacios, called for an end to the killings and for the authorities to provide family searchers with "protection and security".
