= Teresa González Murillo =

Mexican human rights activist (1972–2025)

- Born: 1972
- Died: 2025 (aged 52–53); San Marcos, Guadalajara, Jalisco
- Cause of death: Shot
- Occupations: Street vendor Madre buscadora
- Organization: Luz de la Esperanza Desaparecidos Jalisco

Teresa "Teresita" González Murillo (1972–2025) was a Mexican human rights activist. She became a madre buscadora following the enforced disappearance of her brother Jaime in 2024. González Murillo was murdered in 2025 while searching for her brother.

== Activism ==
González Murillo was the leader of a group of street vendors operating in downtown Guadalajara, Jalisco. Her brother, Jaime González Murillo, was last seen on 2 September 2024 in the Centro neighbourhood of Guadalajara. González Murillo began appearing in a number of audio and visual materials demanding justice for the victims of enforced disappearances in Jalisco, and was a member of the madres buscadoras collective Luz de la Esperanza Desaparecidos Jalisco. One of her last public appearances was at a demonstration on 15 March 2025 to commemorate victims found in clandestine graves at a ranch linked to organised crime in Teuchitlán.

As a result of her activism, González Murillo had received threats from organised crime groups, and had sought protection from the federal government's human rights protection mechanism. González Murillo's teenage daughter was assaulted outside of her high school, which led to González Murillo seeking support from the Guadalajara police.

== Attempted kidnapping and death ==
On 27 March 2025, González Murillo was the victim of an attempted kidnapping at her home in San Marcos, Guadalajara. It was reported that three men on motorcycles had attempted to take her away, and when they were unsuccessful, shot González Murillo at least twice. She was transported to a local hospital, where she was reported to be in critical condition.

Three days after the attack, Luz de la Esperanza Desaparecidos Jalisco criticised the Ministry of the Interior's failure to activate its protection mechanism for journalists and human rights activists for González Murillo and her family.

On 2 April, González Murillo died of injuries sustained in the shooting. That same day, the Jalisco Attorney General's Office ruled out that she had been the victim of an unsuccessful enforced disappearance, concluding that the incident had nothing to do with her role as a madre buscadora but rather an attempted robbery due to her job as a street vendor and her having allegedly won a "considerable amount" of money in a raffle held the previous night.

On 3 April, the National Human Rights Commission released a statement expressing its solidarity with González Murillo's family, calling on state authorities to investigate her death thoroughly with consideration of her gender and her activism. It also called on state and federal authorities to offer more protection to madres buscadoras.

González Murillo's murder made her the 26th murdered buscadora in Mexico since 2011.

== See also ==
- María del Carmen Morales, a fellow madre buscadora in Jalisco who was murdered three weeks after González Murillo.
