= Teresa González =

Teresa González may refer to:

- Teresa González de Lara (1220–1246), Castilian noblewoman, member of the House of Lara
- Teresa González de Fanning (1836–1918), Peruvian writer and journalist, activist for women's education
- Teresa González Murillo (1972–2025), murdered Mexican human rights activist
