= Glorieta de la Palma =

Roundabout in Mexico City

- Roundabout
- Glorieta del Ahuehuete; Glorieta de las y los Desaparecidos
- Nickname: La Palma
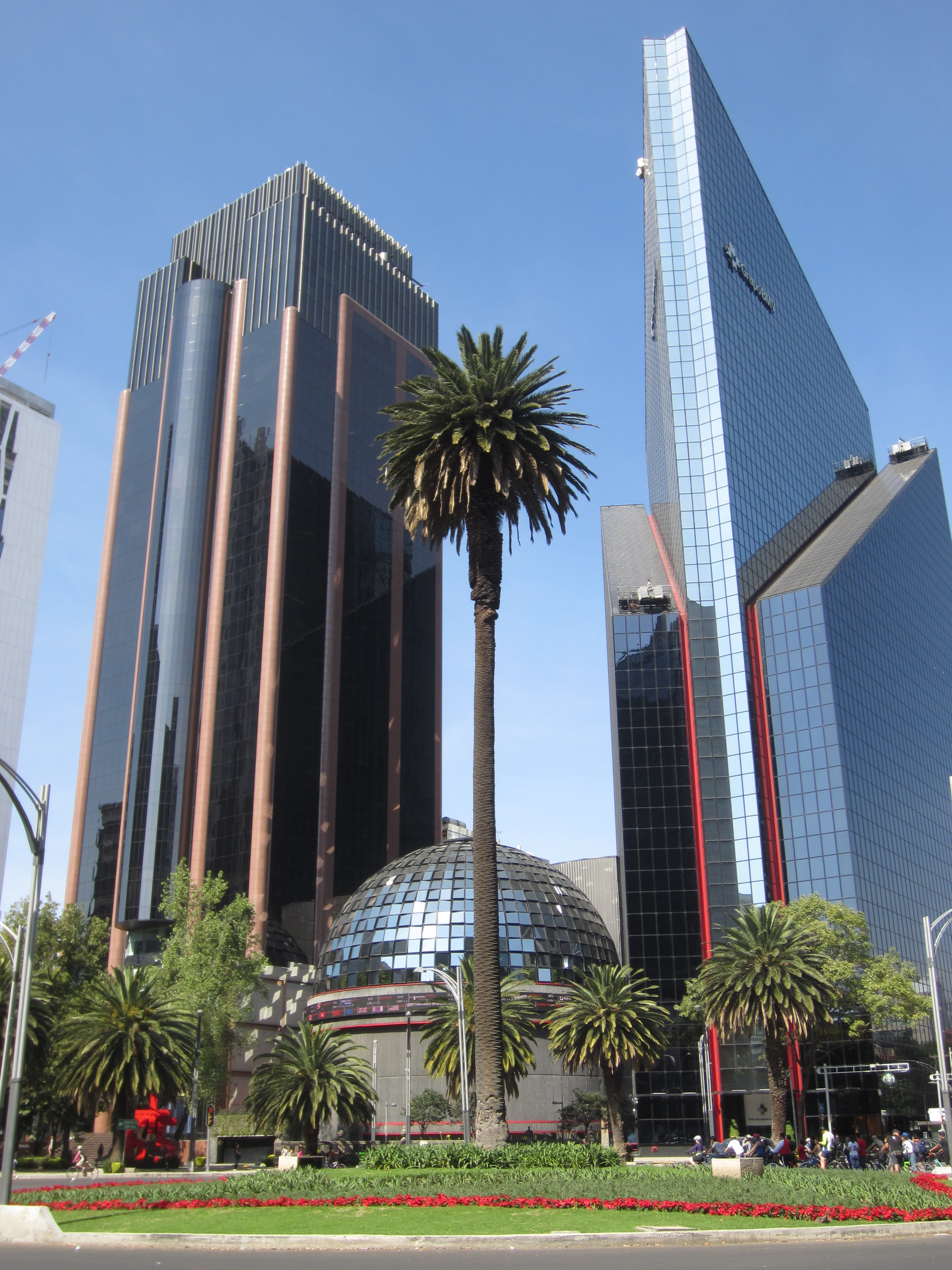
- The roundabout in 2018
- Design: Louis Bolland and Ferdinand von Rosenzweig
- Opened: 1865
- Height: 20 m (66 ft) (palm tree)
- Owner: Government of Mexico City
- Location: Cuauhtémoc, Mexico City
- Address: Paseo de la Reforma, Río Rhin Street and Niza Street
- Interactive map of Glorieta de la Palma
- Coordinates: 19°25′44″N 99°9′49″W

Glorieta de la Palma (lit. transl. Palm roundabout) is a roundabout in Cuauhtémoc, Mexico City, that connects Paseo de la Reforma with Río Rhin Street and Niza Street. It is known for its tall palm tree that remained in the middle for a century. As of November 2026, the roundabout is the only one along Reforma that has never had a monument. The building of the Mexican Stock Exchange is at the roundabout, opposite the Zona Rosa. The area is serviced by the city's Metrobús system at El Ahuehuete BRT stop (formerly "La Palma"), whose pictogram formerly featured the palm tree.

The palm died in 2022 due to pathogens. After a non-binding poll, a Taxodium mucronatum (otherwise known as Montezuma cypress or ahuehuete) was placed in June 2022 and the city government officially renamed the traffic circle the Glorieta del Ahuehuete (Ahuehuete roundabout). At the same time, activists placed an anti-monument in memory of the more than 100,000 disappeared people in the country and symbolically renamed the place the Glorieta de las y los Desaparecidos (Roundabout of the Disappeared). The tree, however, had an unfavorable adaptation and eight months later was removed for rehabilitation and replaced with a similar tree.

== History ==
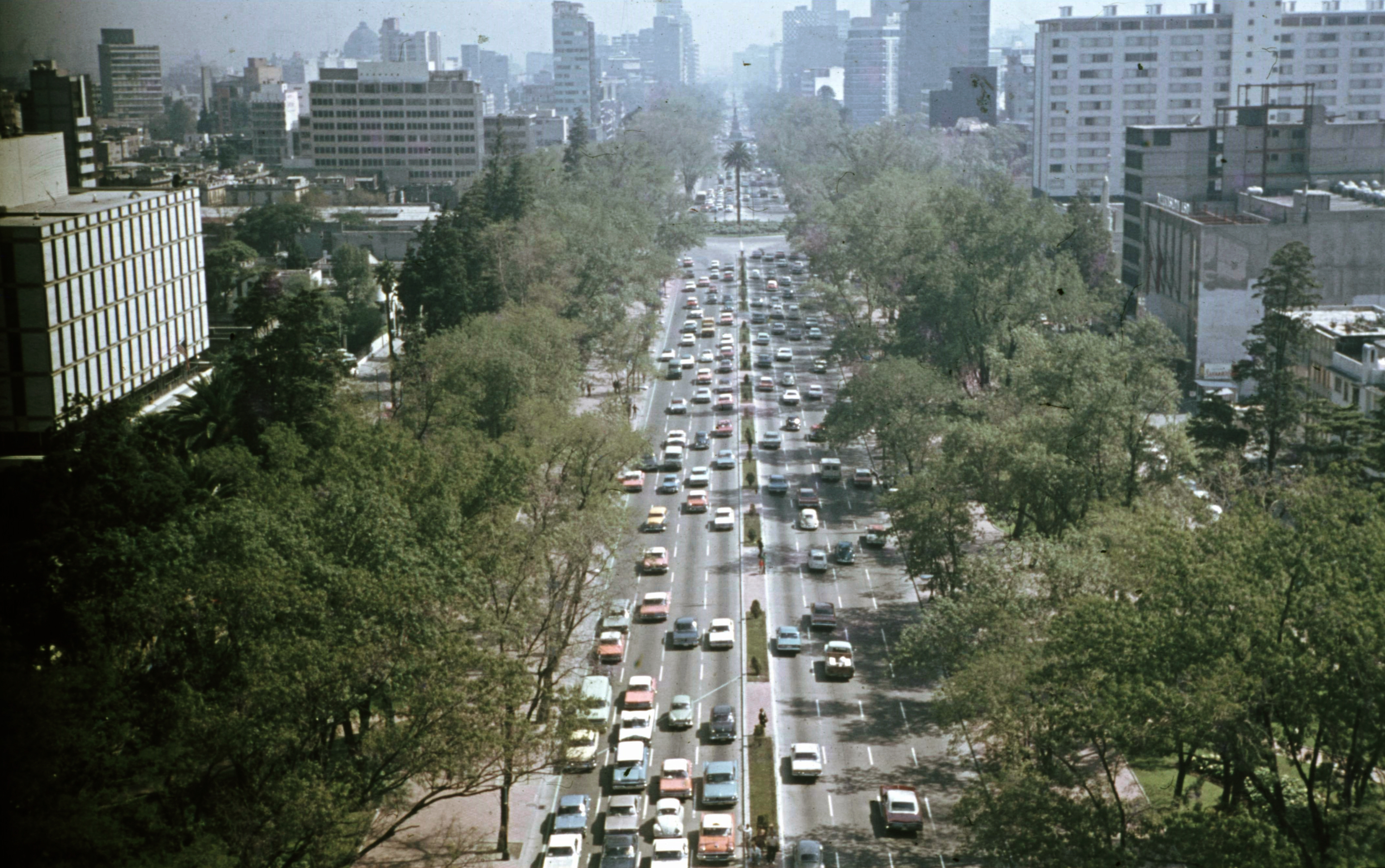
The roundabout in 1968

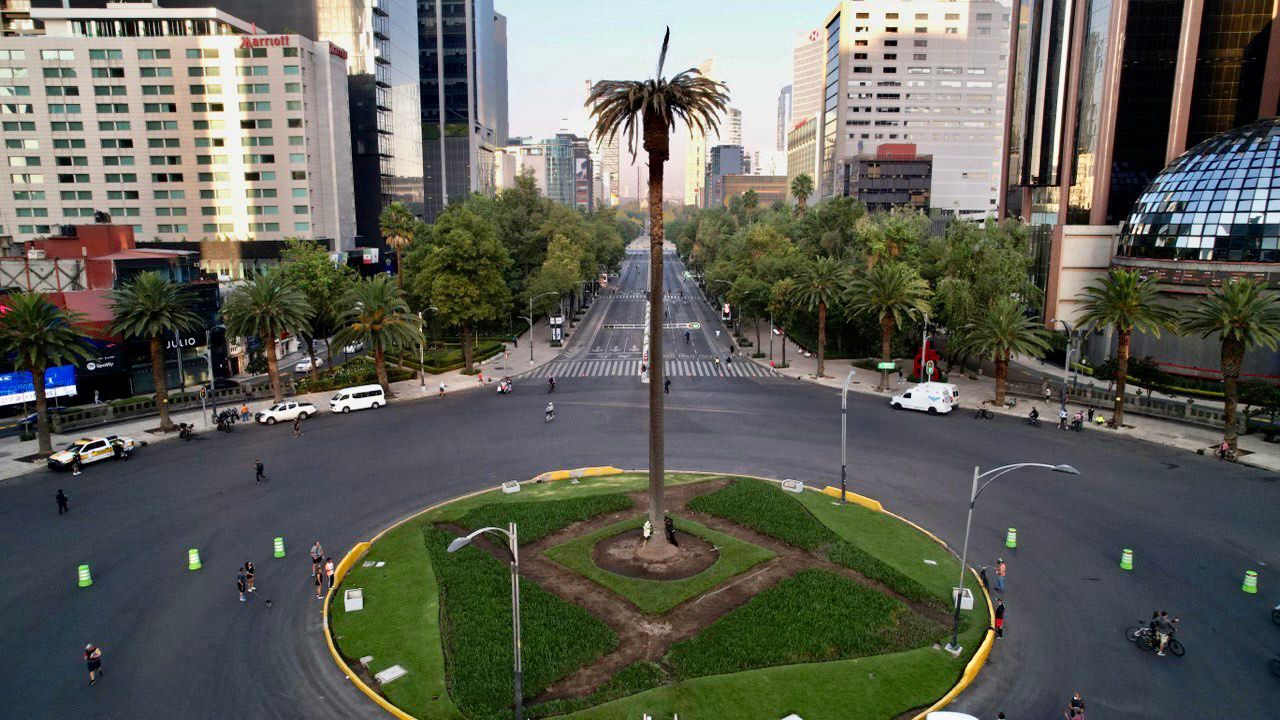
The palm tree on 24 April 2022

The roundabout was included in Louis Bolland and Ferdinand von Rosenzweig's original plan for the boulevard, and finished as Reforma's second roundabout completed in 1865. The Angel of Independence column was constructed in 1910 to celebrate the centenary of Independence and, according to one of the versions, the roundabout could be set aside for the construction of another memorial to mark the bicentennial of Independence in 2010. Up to ten palm trees were eventually planted there, and the earliest known photograph showing the middle tree is from 1920. All but the central palm tree were removed around 1950.

Carlos Martínez Assad, emeritus researcher at the National Autonomous University of Mexico, disputed the age of the palm and considers its real age to be between 70 and 80 years as, according to him, it was a gift from Haile Selassie, the last Emperor of Ethiopia, to Lázaro Cárdenas as compensation for his stand against Italy's occupation during the Second Italo-Ethiopian War. He also said that the traffic circle was reserved for a sculpture of Benito Juárez that was sent instead to Guanajuato.

The palm tree died in 2022 as a result of pathogens and fungi that had infected several palm trees in the city. On 24 April, the government conducted a symbolic farewell ceremony in the late afternoon, and that evening, it was cut down. Its remains were transferred to a vivarium in Xochimilco, where artists would elaborate sculptures with the unaffected wood. The palm tree had a height of 20 meters (66 ft) high.

=== Ahuehuete roundabout ===
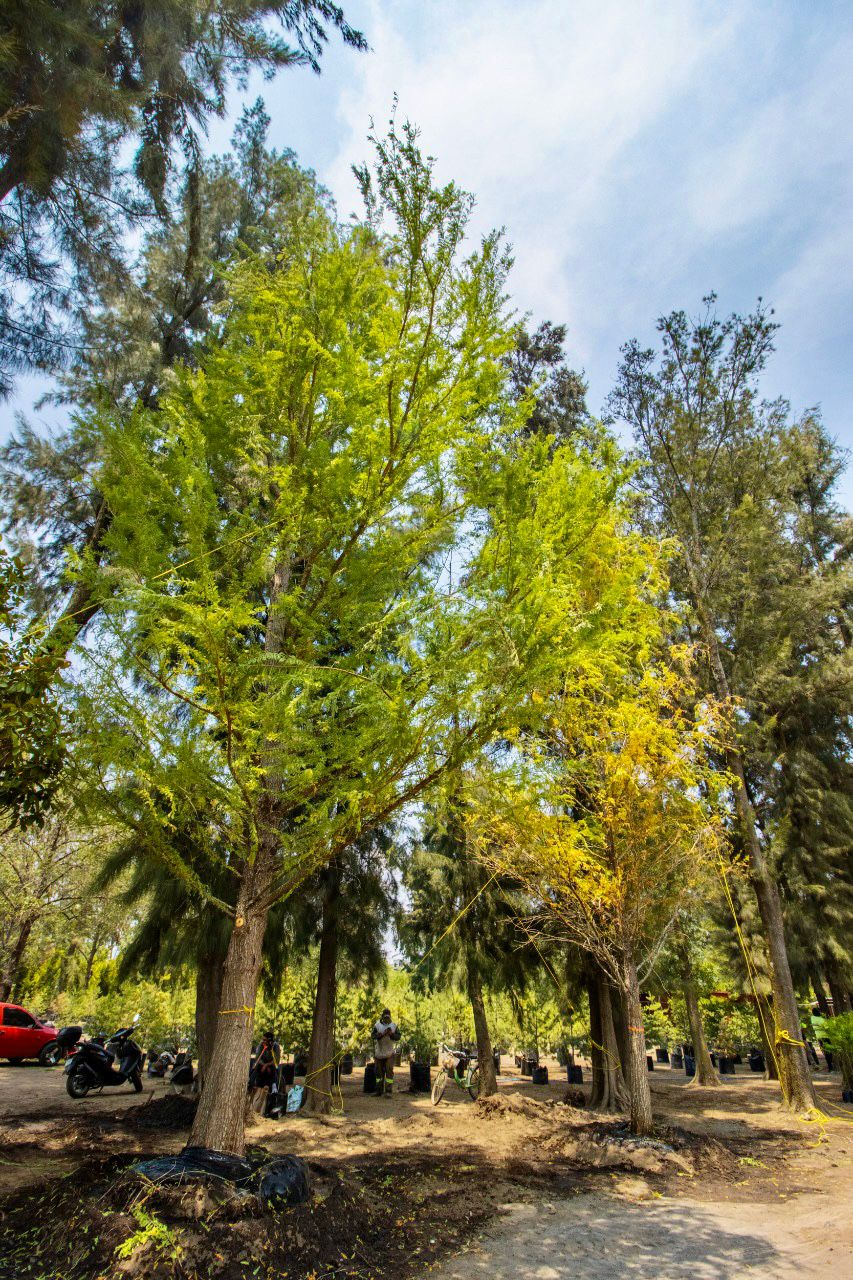
The first Montezuma tree (left) before being relocated

The city government, headed by Claudia Sheinbaum, surveyed to question which tree should replace it, with options including a jacaranda or a Montezuma cypress; however, a palm tree would not be able to do so because it would contract the same pathogens. A Montezuma cypress, also known as an ahuehuete, was chosen in a non-binding poll with more than 77,000 votes, Sheinbaum announced it would be planted on 5 June 2022 (on World Environment Day). The 20-year-old tree, a native of Monterrey, Nuevo León, is 10 meters (33 ft) tall and weighs 10 metric tons (9.8 long tons; 11 short tons).

Two days after the tree was planted, a motorist lost control of her car and slammed into the roundabout, severing one of the wires holding the tree up and tipping it over. The tree had a dry appearance for several weeks as a result of the accident and the habitat shift. The tree started to exhibit signs of improvement by the end of July of that year. In September 2022, the city government walled off the traffic circle to bar pedestrian entry because of the recovery slowness. The safety fence was struck by another car the following month. In November 2022, Saúl Alcántara, a specialist in garden conservation at the Universidad Autónoma Metropolitana and who collaborated in the successful transfer of other similar specimens in the city, said that the tree's chance of improvement was minimal. Alcántara attributed the causes of the drying out to incorrect re-planting beyond subsequent events.

The city government announced on 9 March that since the tree did not improve, it would be replaced with a tree of the same species and nursery. Two days later, the tree was removed and sent to the Xochimilco vivarium for its rehabilitation.

The city government sowed its replacement on 19 May 2023. It is a 20-year-old tree that is approximately 12 meters (39 ft) tall. Three days later, a man crossed the protective fence and began pouring fresh cement over the tree's roots and soil, as well as uninstalling the irrigation system. The man was arrested and was charged with malicious damage to property and environment. Sheinbaum regretted the incident and when questioned about the motives, she said, "Who is interested in killing an ahuehuete? Well, only the one with a political agenda".

=== Roundabout of the Disappeared ===
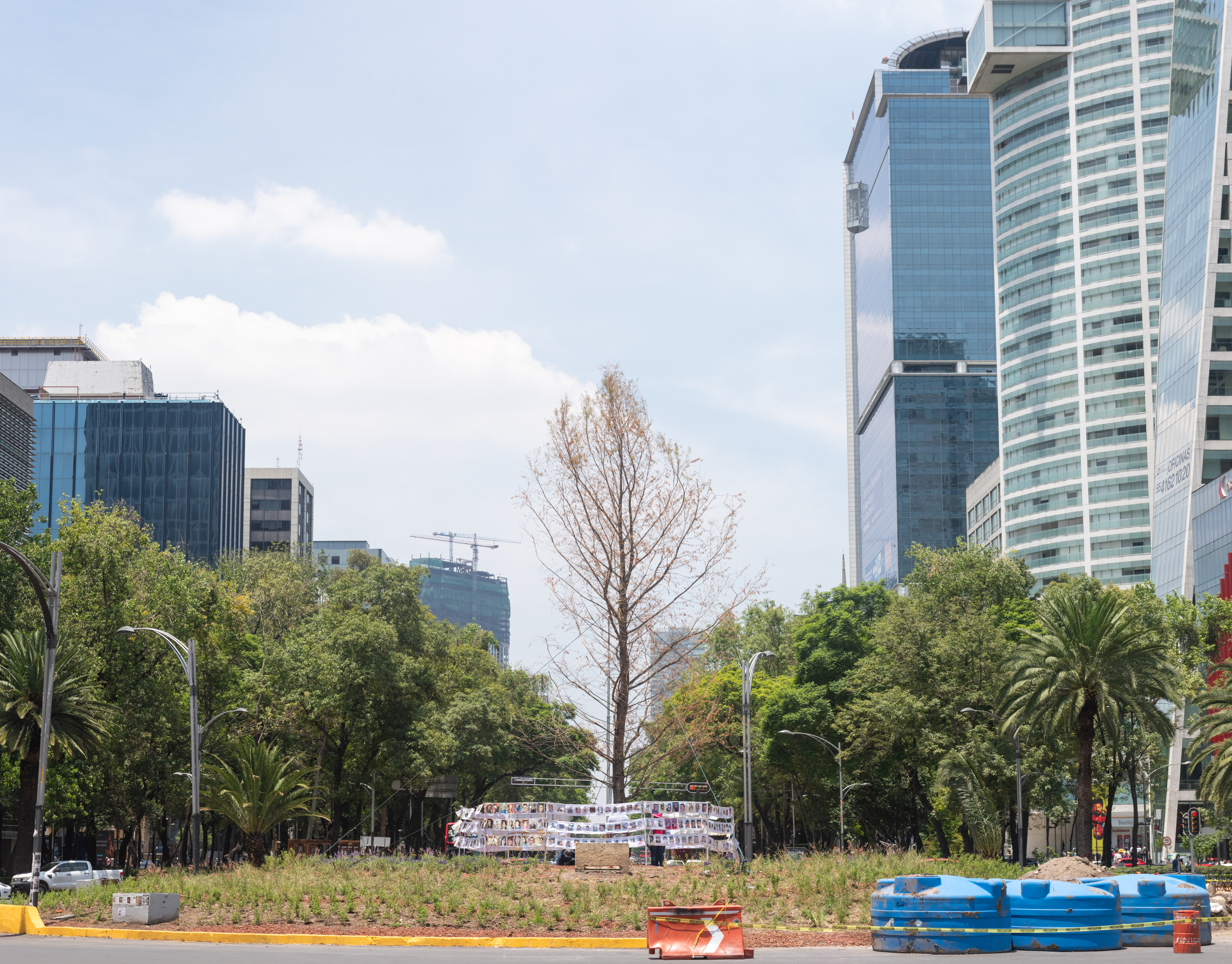
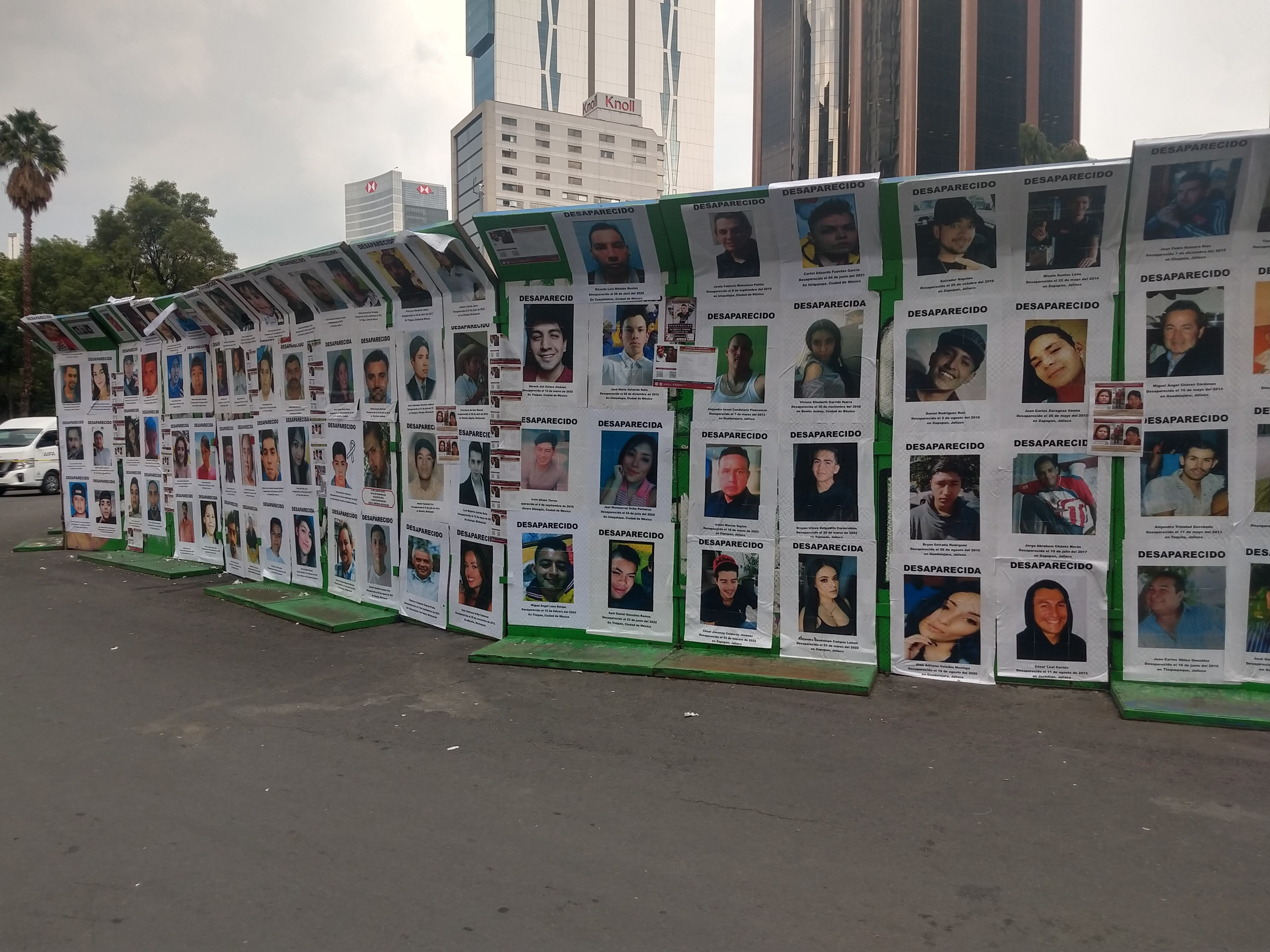
The first intervention to the traffic circle (top) featured the tree surrounded by pictures of missing people. Weeks later, the tree was enclosed by protective fences. Activists painted and placed their pictures again. Later, these were painted by the authorities with Christmas-themed decorations. After that, activists restored their paintings and posters (bottom).

On 8 May 2022, collectives in search of disappeared people symbolically intervened the empty traffic circle, renamed it and installed the Glorieta de las y los Desaparecidos (Roundabout of the Disappeared) anti-monument. Photos of the missing were posted on the location, just like what occurred at the nearby Glorieta de las mujeres que luchan, which was taken over by feminists. In order to draw attention to the nearly 100,000 instances of missing persons reported in the nation as of May 2022, (Note: As of December 2023, the reported figure was over 110,000 missing people. In that month, the government reduced officially the figure to 12,377 missing people considering that 16,681 people were found, 17,843 located, and 1,951 were duplicate reports. Of the remainder, 26,090 cases did not contain sufficient data to initiate an investigation and the acquaintances of 36,022 cases did not have updated addresses to begin investigations.) the collectives installed the pictures. Sheinbaum rejected their initiative because "a group of people cannot be above a vote". The authorities took down the images and banners in the hours that followed. The collectives' representatives claimed that they were not opposed to the Montezuma cypress and that both plans could coexist, but they criticized the government for "disappearing the disappeared" in their statements.

Activists reinstalled the pictures of the missing people a few hours after the Montezuma cypress was planted, they nicknamed the tree El guardián de los desaparecidos ("The Guardian of the Disappeared") and they asked the officials to officially rename the roundabout the Glorieta de las y los Desaparecidos. In this regard, government representatives have mentioned that they would prefer to intervene the Estela de Luz, a monument also located on the avenue, into a memorial in honor of the missing. Human rights organizations symbolically changed the names of the Hamburgo and Glorieta de Colón stations of the Mexico City Metrobús to "Glorieta de las y los Desaparecidos" and "Glorieta de las Mujeres Que Luchan", respectively on 24 July 2022. The protest symbols were used in lieu of the station pictograms in the signage while maintaining the system's design aesthetic. As a result of the numerous anti-monument memorials situated along the road, Paseo de la Reforma has been symbolically renamed the Ruta de la Memoria (Route of Memory).

The photos were once more taken on 6 November 2022 and Christmas decorations were added to the security fences. The following week, activists repainted the area and urged Andrés Manuel López Obrador, the president of Mexico, to keep his pledge to meet with them to address the disappearances.

In February 2023, the city government announced that 20 volcanic rock memorial obelisks ranging in height from 1.6 m (5 ft 3 in) to 2 m (6 ft 7 in) with poems carved on them would be placed at the traffic circle. Collectives in search of missing persons criticized the project as unilateral and compared the proposal with the Memorial to Victims of Violence in Mexico located meters away from their anti-monument, which they called a "vile and offensive memorial without remembrance". Additionally, they said that if the project went forward, they would intervene in the stelae to create their own memorial.
