= Hacienda Santa Fe =

- City
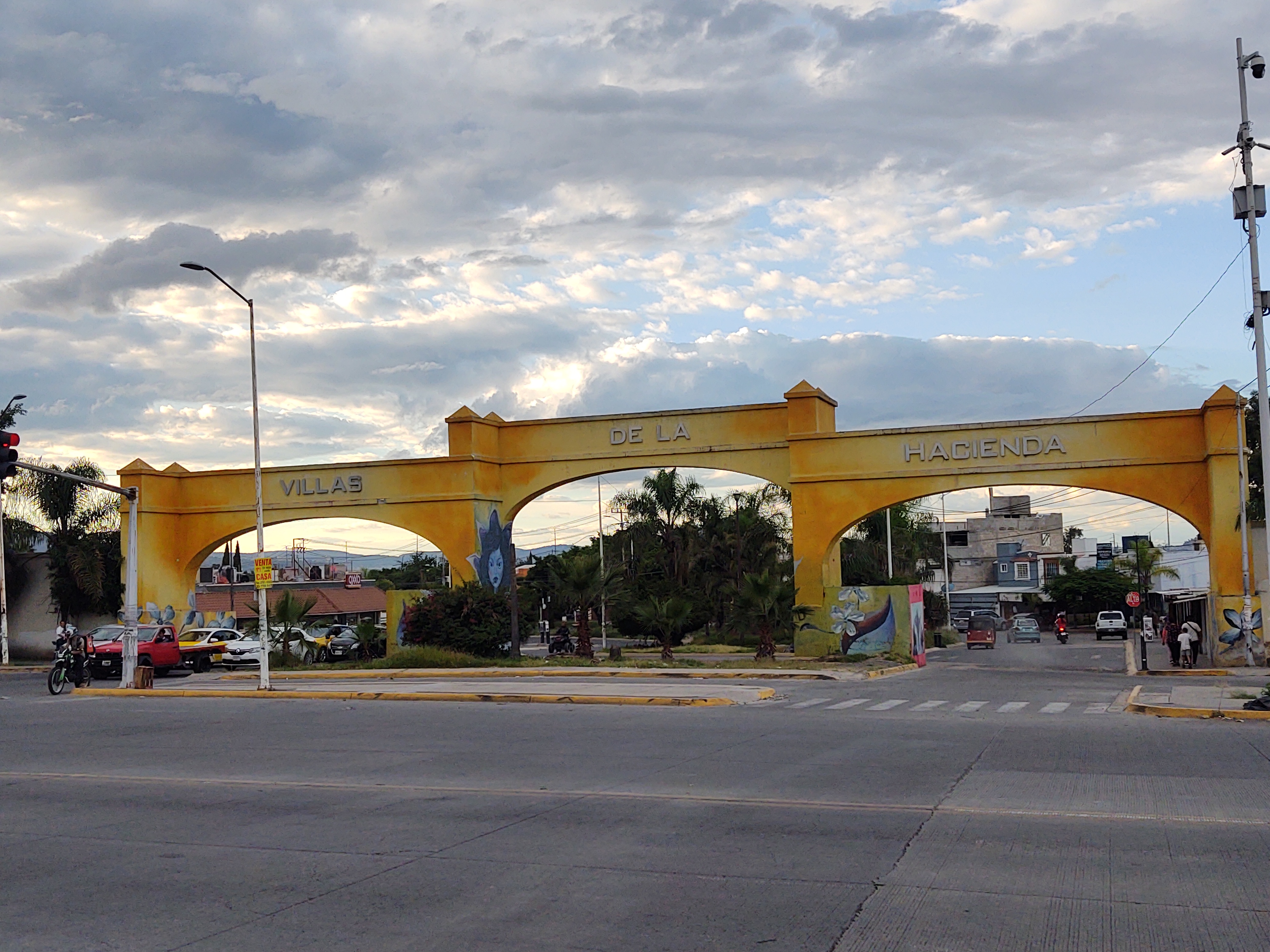
- Villas de la Hacienda neighborhood entrance

- Location in Jalisco Hacienda Santa Fe (Mexico)
- Coordinates: 20°31′05″N 103°22′50″W
- Country: Mexico
- State: Jalisco
- Municipality: Tlajomulco de Zúñiga
- Established: 16th century

Population (2020)
  - Total: 139,174
- Time zone: UTC−6 (CST)

Hacienda Santa Fe is a city in the municipality of Tlajomulco de Zuñiga, Jalisco. It is the largest city in the municipality with a population of 139,174 people in 2020. It is located in the central part of the state.

== Geography ==
Hacienda Santa Fe is located 26 km south of Guadalajara and 22 km from the Guadalajara International Airport. It is within the Guadalajara metropolitan area.
