= Mario Moreno Álvarez =

Mexican politician (born 1964)

- Born: 12 November 1964 (age 61); Jalisco, Mexico
- Occupation: Politician
- Political party: PAN

Mario Eduardo Moreno Álvarez (born 12 November 1964) is a Mexican politician affiliated with the National Action Party (PAN). In the 2006 general election he was elected to the Chamber of Deputies to represent Jalisco's 12th district during the 60th session of Congress.
