= Sandra Domínguez =

Mexican human rights activist (1987–2024)

- Born: 1987; San Isidro Huayápam, Oaxaca, Mexico
- Died: 2024 (aged 36–37)
- Cause of death: Murdered
- Body discovered: Santiago Sochiapan, Veracruz, Mexico
- Resting place: San Pedro Ixtlahuaca, Oaxaca, Mexico
- Occupation: Human rights activist
- Organization: Liberal Union of Oaxacan Women
- Spouse: Alexander Hernández

Sandra Estefana Domínguez Martínez (1987–2024) was a Mexican human rights activist who advocated for the rights of indigenous women in Oaxaca.

== Activism ==
Domínguez was born in San Isidro Huayápam, a Mixe community in eastern Oaxaca, and was of Mixe heritage. She went on to study law at university.

After graduating, Domínguez founded the Liberal Union of Oaxacan Women, an organisation that promoted women's rights, particularly of Mixe women, including encouraging them to enter politics. It also offered support and advice to victims and survivors of domestic abuse as well as the families of missing women. After moving to María Lombardo de Caso, Domínguez started working as a mediator within the Mixe communities, in addition to supporting victims of rape and the families of missing and murdered women.

In 2011 and 2012, Domínguez worked at the Superior Court of Justice in Oaxaca, and she later worked for Secretariat of Welfare as a coordinator and as the secretary of indigenous action for the Institutional Revolutionary Party's Oaxaca branch.

In 2020, Domínguez reported that Donato Vargas, then the head of the National Institute of Indigenous Peoples, was the administrator for a WhatsApp group entitled Sierra XXX in which intimate photos of Mixe women and officials were being shared and distributed, including of Domínguez. Domínguez also criticised the governor of Oaxaca, Salomón Jara Cruz, for enabling Vargas. The public controversy that arose around the group led to the sacking of several local officials; Domínguez reported she began receiving threats as a result of her report.

In 2023, Domínguez publicly supported Vargas' ex-partner, Mixe economist Martha Aracely Cruz Jiménez, who accused him of domestic abuse. Domínguez also alleged that there was an additional WhatsApp group, entitled Mega Peda, in which intimate photos continued to be shared among Oaxacan officials, which she alleged Vargas was also a part of.

== Disappearance and death ==
On 8 October 2024, Domínguez and her husband, Alexander Hernández, were reported missing by her family, who stated that they had last been seen on 4 October at their home in María Lombardo de Caso in San Juan Cotzocón.

Investigations into Domínguez and Hernández's disappearances were opened by the Oaxaca State Commission for the Search of Disappeared Persons and the Oaxaca State Attorney General's Office, as well as by officials in the nearby state of Veracruz. A reward of up to 350, 000 MXN was offered for information that led to the safe recovery of Domínguez and Hernández.

On 10 October, Domínguez's car was found abandoned in Playa Vicente, Veracruz; activity from her mobile phone was also detected in the area. Domínguez's phone was subsequently recovered in El Nigromante.

On 11 October, Domínguez's mother called on the President of Mexico, Claudia Sheinbaum, to help locate Domínguez and Hernández. That same day, the Mixe community of San Isidro Huayapám called on the Oaxacan governor, Salomón Jara, to intensify the search.

On 15 October, the secretary of the Government of Oaxaca, Jesús Romero López, stated that one potential line of investigation included the allegations that Domínguez had made against Donato Vargas in 2020 and 2023, though he was not named as a suspect.

On 17 October, President Sheinbaum publicly commented on Domínguez's disappearance, stating that "all necessary forces" were investigating her disappearance.

Amnesty International demanded Domínguez's safe return and started a counter on its website tracking the amount of days she had been missing. It sent a public letter to Salomón Jara Cruz demanding a thorough investigation into her disappearance.

On 24 April 2025, the bodies of Domínguez and Hernández were found in hidden graves at a property located on a dirt road between La Ceiba and Unión Progreso in Santiago Sochiapan, Veracruz. Following the discovery of the bodies, Oaxacan authorities publicly declared that one line of investigation was that Domínguez and Hernández had been members of criminal organisations in Veracruz, or that Hernández had been a member and Domínguez had been a collateral victim as a result of infighting between local criminal groups. While executing a warrant for the arrest of an unnamed suspect at a ranch in El Capricho, a shootout occurred, leading to the deaths of two associates of the suspect and one member of the federal police.

Domínguez's mother and sisters criticised the authorities' description of Domínguez being a member of any criminal groups and expressed their anger at the "criminalisation" of Domínguez's character, urging authorities to reconsider her activism as a line of enquiry in the investigation.

Domínguez was buried at San Pedro Ixtlahuaca cemetery. Yésica Sánchez Maya, a Oaxacan government official, stated a memorial would be held for her on 29 April. Federal deputy Martha Aracely Cruz Jiménez, whom Domínguez had publicly supported in 2023, requested a minute of silence at the Chamber of Deputies in recognition of Domínguez's defence of indigenous women and her activism against misogyny in Oaxaca.
