= Celia Isabel Gauna Ruiz =

Mexican politician and architect

- Born: 19 November 1964 (age 61); Guadalajara, Jalisco, Mexico
- Occupations: Politician and architect
- Political party: PRI

Celia Isabel Gauna Ruiz (born 19 November 1964) is a Mexican politician affiliated with the Institutional Revolutionary Party (PRI). In the 2012 general election she was elected to the Chamber of Deputies to represent Jalisco's 12th district during the 62nd session of Congress.
