= Sandra Luz Hernández =

Mexican madre buscadora (1960–2014)

- Born: 1960; Mexico
- Died: 12 May 2014 (aged 53–54); Culiacán, Sinaloa, Mexico
- Cause of death: Gunshot wounds
- Occupation: Madre buscadora
- Years active: 2012–2014

Sandra Luz Martínez Hernández (Note: In this Mexican name, the surname is Martínez and the second or maternal family name is Hernández. By her own choice, Hernández was known by her second surname.) (1960–2014) was a Mexican human rights activist and madre buscadora. A member of Madres con hijos desaparecidos (lit. 'Mothers with Disappeared Children'), she was murdered while searching for her missing son, Édgar García Hernández, in Sinaloa.

== Activism ==
In February 2012, Hernández's son, Édgar, disappeared after he was abducted by armed individuals who had broken into his home. Édgar worked for Marco Antonio Higuera Gómez, then serving as Attorney General of Sinaloa.

Two years after Édgar's disappearance, Hernández began her own investigation to find him, while also holding public protests about the authorities' inaction in searching for him. She joined Madres con hijos desaparecidos, a collective of women whose children had disappeared, which campaigned against impunity regarding the disappearances of young people in Mexico.

Hernández publicly said to both the press and authorities that she believed Gabriel and Joel Valenzuela Valenzuela were involved in Edgar's disappearance and had information about his whereabouts. She publicly called on Governor of Sinaloa Mario López Valdez and Gerardo Vargas Landeros, the general secretary of the Government of Sinaloa, to demand they be summoned for interview; the men were never summoned.

== Murder and investigation ==
On 12 May 2014, Hernández attended a meeting with staff from the Sinaloa Attorney General's office. She later received a telephone call instructing her to meet with an informant in the Benito Juárez neighbourhood of Culiacán. Accompanied by another activist, she arrived at the designated location at 16:00, following which she was shot at least 15 times by a man, who then fled the scene.

On 20 May, the Attorney General of Sinaloa announced that Jesús Fernando Rodríguez Valenzuela, a 25-year-old man, had been arrested in relation to Hernández's murder. It said that he had committed the murder for "personal reasons" and that the shooting was unrelated to Hernández's work as an activist and madre buscadora, with Valenzuela being reported to be an acquaintance of Hernández's son Édgar. The state prosecutor alleged that, following Hernández's "pressure" on her son's friends during her investigation into his disappearance, Valenzuela had "panicked" and killed her. It was reported that Rodríguez Valenzuela's car had been seen by a witness close to the crime scene, and that he had led investigators to where he disposed of the gun used in the shooting.

On 21 May, the prosecutor stated that Rodríguez Valenzuela had linked Édgar to the kidnapping and murder of a person in 2012 in order to steal 120,000 USD from them. It was alleged by human rights groups that the prosecutor's statement linking Édgar to criminality was done to "criminalise" Hernández and her search for her son.

On 13 March 2015, Rodríguez Valenzuela was acquitted by the Ninth Criminal Court in Culiacán due to a lack of evidence and "negligence in due process". His lawyer also stated that Rodríguez Valenzuela had experienced arbitrary detention and had been kept in "unsanitary" conditions.

== Legacy ==
Two days after Hernández's murder, the federal Secretariat of the Interior issued a statement urging Governor López Valdez to conduct a "thorough investigation" into her death, stating it "would not rest" until Hernández's killer had been brought to justice.

Red TDT, an association of 84 Mexican human rights organisations, issued a statement condemning Hernández's murder and demanding justice, while expressing solidarity with her family. The Mexican Commission for the Defence and Promotion of Human Rights also released a statement calling on authorities to investigate both Hernández's murder and also the disappearance of her son. The Executive Commission for Attention to Victims lamented Hernández's death, and commented on the intimidation, violence and attacks suffered by activists trying to help the victims of enforced disappearances and murders, as well as to achieve justice for them.

The National Human Rights Commission (CNDH) initiated its own investigation into Hernández's death, which it shared with the Attorney General of Sinaloa. It requested local authorities provide "precautionary measures" for Hernández's family.
