= Sergio Vázquez García =

Mexican politician

- Born: 6 October 1967 (age 58); Guadalajara, Jalisco, Mexico
- Occupation: Politician
- Political party: PAN

Sergio Vázquez García (born 6 October 1967) is a Mexican politician affiliated with the National Action Party (PAN). In the 2003 mid-terms he was elected to the Chamber of Deputies to represent Jalisco's 12th district during the 59th session of Congress.
