= Madres Buscadoras de Sonora =

Mexican missing people organization

- Formation: 2019; 7 years ago
- Founder: Ceci Flores Armenta
- Location: Sonora, Mexico

The Madres Buscadoras de Sonora (Searching Mothers of Sonora) is a Mexican non-profit organization dedicated to finding lost people in the state of Sonora, and occasionally in other states. The organization was formed in 2019, in response to increasing rates of murders, femicides, and disappearances.

It is formed primarily of mothers with missing children, who seek to recover the remains of their relatives. The women carry out the field search for bodies and human remains, as well as the identification of those buried in mass graves. The organization has around 700 women members and has conducted searches across Sonora, including the locations of Caborca, Cajeme, Guaymas, Hermosillo, Huatabampo, Magdalena, Nogales, and Puerto Peñasco.

As of July 2024, the group has reported recovering 2,700 bodies and reuniting 2,400 living people with their families.

== History ==
The group was created following the disappearance of Ceci Patricia Flores Armenta's two sons: one in 2015 in Los Mochis, Sinaloa, and the other in 2019 in Bahía de Kino, Sonora. Flores Armenta felt the local authorities did not thoroughly investigate her case, and decided to found Madres Buscadoras to respond to other cases.

In May 2019, Madres buscadoras de Sonora was founded. In its first year, Madres Buscadoras recovered 52 sets of remains near Puerto Peñasco. By January 2020, the group had 200 members and had located and identified 79 sets of remains. In 2022, the group located 25 sets of remains in the Sonoran Desert between Hermosillo and Bahía Kino. In September 2023, the group was shot at while performing a search in Guaymas. In 2024, the group reported finding a clandestine crematorium on the outskirts of Mexico City.

The group has carried out searches around the United States–Mexico border, in collaboration with the U.S.-based organization Armadillos Binacional.

In 2026, some members of the group assisted in the search for Nancy Guthrie in Arizona and in the border city of Nogales.

== Search protocols ==
The group "are not forensic experts and don’t claim to be", but have learned how to identify evidence as the scenes, such as differentiating human and animal bones, "[recognizing] the smell of decomposing human bodies," and knowing which fragments of bone are most likely to house usable DNA. After finding physical remains, they call upon government forensic experts, who can test the remains for DNA.

The group uses their Facebook page, which had 700,000 followers by 2023, to share information on missing persons and updates on their searches, at times live streaming their work.

== Threats ==
The threats to the members of the collectives are constant, both through telephone calls and on their Facebook pages, and occasionally in the search field itself. Members have reported that those who provide information to the organizations have also faced retribution, including arson attacks on their homes.

On November 2, 2019, the group, Ceci Flores, and an agent of the Ministerial Criminal Investigation Agency were threatened with death by an armed commando while they were carrying out searches on land in the municipality of Puerto Peñasco. Those threatened immediately left and have not returned to work in that municipality.

On 15 July 2021, Aranza Ramos, a member of the group whose husband had disappeared in 2020, was murdered near her home in Guaymas.

In May 2024, President Andrés Manuel López Obrador derided the group and others like it, saying their members suffered "a delirium of necrophilia".
