= Aranza Ramos =

Mexican human rights activist (1994–2021)

- Born: Gladys Aranza Ramos Gurrola; 1994; Mexico
- Died: 15 July 2021 (aged 26–27); Guaymas, Sonora, Mexico
- Cause of death: Homicide
- Occupation: Human rights activist
- Years active: 2020–2021
- Organization: Madres Buscadoras de Sonora
- Known for: Searching for missing people in Mexico

Gladys Aranza Ramos Gurrola (Note: In this Mexican name, the surname is Ramos and the second or maternal family name is Gurrola.) (1994–2021) was a Mexican human rights activist. A member of Madres Buscadoras de Sonora, she was murdered while searching for her husband, Bryan Omar Celaya Alvarado, who had disappeared in 2020.

== Activism ==
On 6 December 2020, Ramos's husband Bryan was abducted by armed individuals while in his vehicle. Following his disappearance, Ramos reached out to several organisations supporting the families of missing people in Sonora, including Guerreras Buscadoras de Sonora, Madres Buscadoras de Sonora, and Buscadoras por la Paz, and began taking part in searches for both her husband and other missing people.

== Murder and investigation ==
On 15 July 2021, Ramos had returned to her home in Guaymas from a field search with members of the Local Search Commission. At around 23:00, three individuals in a green Nissan Frontier parked outside her home and forcibly removed her from the house; she was transported a few streets away, where she was executed at a site described as an "active extermination zone" by several human rights groups. The men in the car were later identified by the Sonora Prosecutor's Office as Daniel N., Marco Antonio N. and José Martín N., with the man who killed her identified as José Guadalupe N., also known by the alias "El Tepo".

The Sonora Attorney General's Office released a statement linking Ramos's murder to her investigation into the disappearance of her husband, and described her killing as a "femicide", calling on federal, state and municipal authorities to "intensify efforts against impunity". In February 2022, six months after Ramos's murder, the Sonora Attorney General's Office announced that Marco Antonio N., also known as "El Chamelón", had been arrested following a joint mission by the Mexican Navy and Sonora State Public Security forces. On 14 July 2023, Marco Antonio N. was sentenced to 63 years in prison, in addition to a 371,661.50 MXN fine, for Ramos's murder. It was revealed that at the time of his arrest, Marco Antonio N. had been found holding several people hostage at a house in Ejido Estación Ortiz. It was also confirmed that José Guadalupe N., who had shot Ramos, had been himself murdered on 6 August 2021.

== Legacy ==
A coalition of missing people groups in Sonora issued a joint statement calling on both the outgoing and incoming governments of Sonora, as well as the federal government, to not allow Ramos's murder to go "unpunished or unnoticed". It also demanded the protection of the families of missing people, as well as those searching for them, commenting that "they are killing us". On 18 July 2021, the National Human Rights Commission (CNDH) issued a statement condemning Ramos's murder and urging the Sonora authorities to conduct a "thorough and prompt" investigation. President of Mexico Andrés Manuel López Obrador condemned Ramos's murder, stating that his government would "continue to protect all women", stating that there was "no impunity" for the perpetrators of violence.

The Mexican office of the United Nations High Commissioner for Human Rights condemned Ramos's murder and called for authorities to commit to a "thorough" investigation, including exploring the connections between her death and her activism, and to provide support for her family, including her orphaned daughter.
