= Madres buscadoras =

Mexican women activists searching for missing loved ones

Madres buscadoras participate in the 14th annual March of National Dignity in Mexico on May 10, 2026.

Madres buscadoras, also called madres rastreadoras ("searching mothers" in English), are Mexican women activists who search for their missing loved ones (primarily, but not solely, children) or their remains, and justice for the ongoing missing persons crisis in Mexico. Some madres buscadoras work individually, while others work as part of larger coalitions. The MNDM, or Movimiento por Nuestros Desaparecidos en México, is a coalition of 80 such groups, founded in 2015.

The earliest known madre buscadora may be Rosario Ibarra de Piedra, whose son Jesús Piedra Ibarra was forcibly disappeared in 1974; in 1977, she established the Comité Eureka de Desaparecidos to demand justice for those forcibly disappeared and tortured during the Mexican Dirty War.

The mothers have faced hostility from the state and from other groups. Some mothers have themselves gone missing or been murdered, such as Sandra Luz Hernández in 2014. According to the Mexican Ministry of Security and Citizen Protection, at least eight women working as searchers were murdered in 2022 and 2023. In May 2023, Teresa Magueyal was shot dead near her home in Guanajuato. In separate incidents in April 2025, madres buscadoras Teresa González Murillo and María del Carmen Morales, as well as del Carmen Morales' son, were murdered in Jalisco while searching for their missing relatives.

In 2023, a documentary about some of the mothers, titled Volverte a ver, was released.

== Background ==
As of 2024, 116,294 people are listed as missing on the National Registry of Missing and Unlocated Persons; 97% of those people disappeared after 2006, in the aftermath of Mexico's war on drugs. In 2022, 9,826 missing people were reported, and 2,095 people were reported missing in the first quarter of 2023. The mothers, and other activists, have also raised concerns that authorities have removed people from the registry, although they remain missing.

== Activities ==
Groups of madres buscadoras work to teach women about reporting missing people, searching for remains, laws relevant to searches, and other relevant skills. After locating remains, the mothers contact forensic researchers to confirm the identity of the bodies. In addition to searching for remains, the mothers also investigate sites such as hospitals, prisons, and sites of sex work and homelessness, due to the possibility of loved ones being human trafficked. The mothers have seen success on both fronts. One organization, the Madres Buscadoras de Sonora, have found 1,230 bodies in clandestine graves and located 1,300 living people since 2019.

Public activities include putting up posters to seek information from the public, and holding demonstrations. The mothers have also used social media (including Facebook, Twitter, and WhatsApp) to gather potential leads.

Since 2011, a group of madres buscadoras has held the National March of Dignity (also called the Marcha Nacional de Madres Buscadoras, or National March of Searching Mothers) each year in Mexico City on Mother's Day. The march aims to raise awareness of missing people in the country and to pressure authorities to improve policies surrounding the issue. The parade is also attended by civil service organizations who support of the cause, including Amnesty International. Some participants don headscarves, in reference to the Grandmothers of Plaza de Mayo in Argentina.

In June 2026, a number of madres buscadoras staged a protest during the opening match of the 2026 FIFA World Cup at Estadio Azteca, aiming to bring attention to their cause. In Guadalajara, the activists posted World Cup-style posters of their missing relatives around the city. Activists involved in both protests expressed that although they did not oppose the World Cup in theory, they did oppose what they viewed as excessive spending in the face of so many unsolved missing persons cases.

== Selected groups ==
- Colectivo Amor por los Desaparecidos en Tamaulipas; Tamaulipas
- Corazones sin Justicia, Sinaloa
- Luz de Esperanza; Jalisco
- Madres Buscadoras de Sonora; Sonora
- Madres Unidas y Fuertes de Baja California; Baja California
- Movimiento por Nuestros Desaparecidos en México (MNDM); national
- Sabuesos Guerreros AC
- Salamanca United in the Search for the Disappeared, Salamanca, Guanajuato

== Selected madres buscadoras ==
- María del Carmen Morales (1982–2025), Jalisco
- Teresa González Murillo (1972–2025), Jalisco
- Sandra Luz Hernández (1960–2014), Sinaloa
- Rosario Ibarra (1927–2022), Nuevo León
- Teresa Magueyal (1958–2023), Guanajuato
- Zenaida Pulido (1976–2019), Michoacán
- Aranza Ramos (1994–2021), Sonora
