= Joel González Díaz =

Mexican politician (born 1965)

- Born: 23 February 1965 (age 61); El Salto, Jalisco, Mexico
- Occupation: Politician
- Political party: PRI

Joel González Díaz (born 23 February 1965) is a Mexican politician from the Institutional Revolutionary Party (PRI). In the 2009 mid-terms he was elected to the Chamber of Deputies to represent Jalisco's 12th district during the 61st session of Congress.
