= Gurrola =

Gurrola is a Basque surname from Biscay. Notable people with the surname include:

- Alberto Gurrola (1993–2022), Mexican footballer
- Eva Gurrola (born 1994), Mexican weightlifter
- José Gurrola (born 1998), Mexican footballer
