= Ferdinand von Rosenzweig =

Austrian military officer and architect

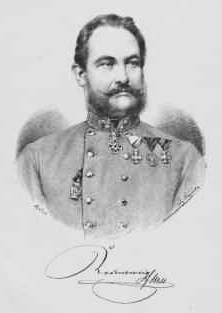
Ferdinand von Rosenzweig

Ferdinand Freiherr Rosenzweig von Drauwehr (July 11, 1812 – September 4, 1892) was an Austrian military officer and architect.

== Biography ==
Rosenzweig was born in Eisenstadt in the Austrian Empire. He served first under Kaiser Franz Joseph I of Austria-Hungary and then under Emperor Maximilian I of Mexico.

He was married to Hungarian Princess Catarina Radzivil de Atavia, who was a lady in the court of Empress Carlota of Mexico. During his service to the Emperor of Mexico, he traced and built the current famous avenue Paseo de la Reforma, in that time called Paseo de la Emperatriz ("Promenade of the Empress"); and later renamed. After the fall of the Second Mexican Empire, during the post-Maximilian era, he built several other structures such as the Necaxa Ridge, which was Mexico City first source of electricity.

== Sources ==
- Antonio Schmidt-Brentano: Die k.k. bzw. k.u.k. Generalität 1816-1918, Österreichisches Staatsarchiv, 2007, p. 154.
