= Teuchitlán =

- Municipality and town
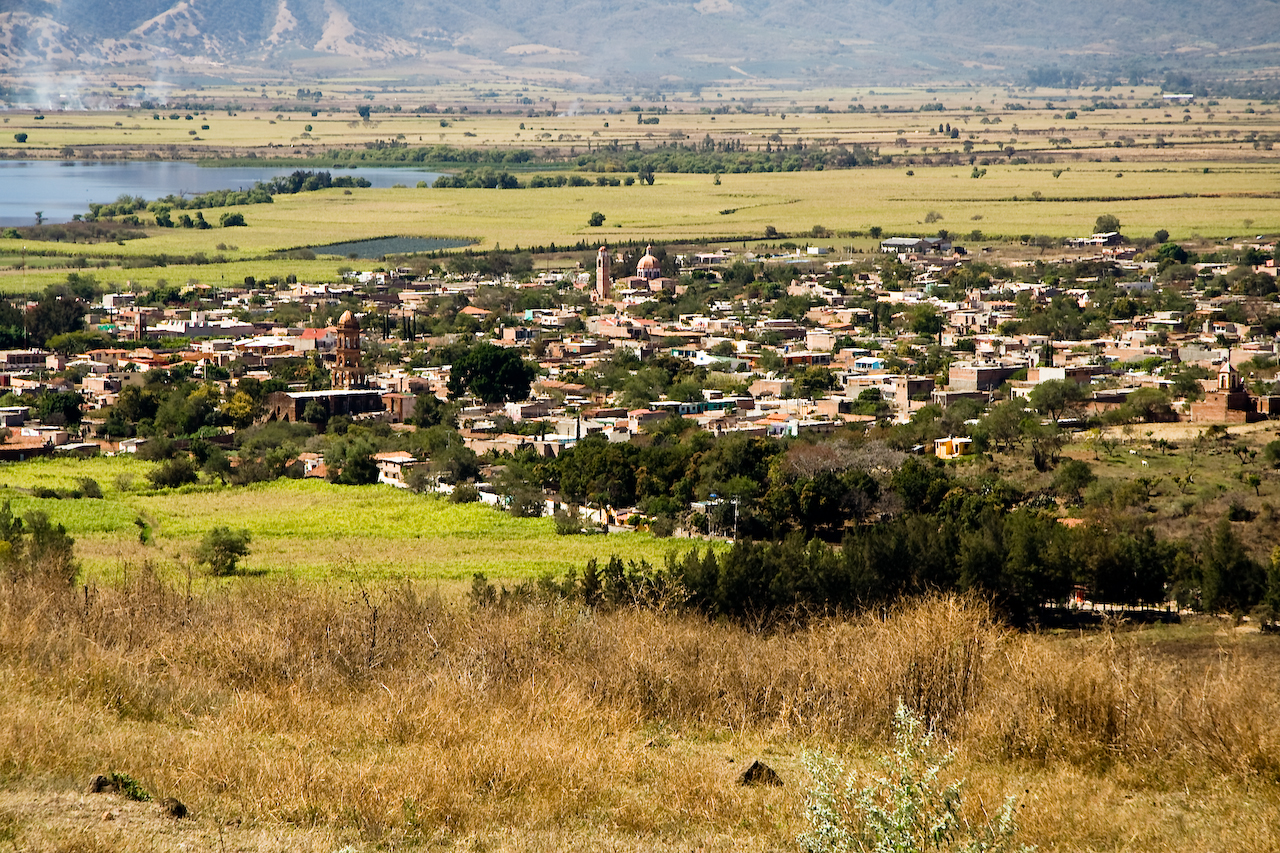

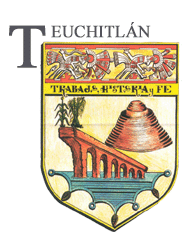
- Coat of arms

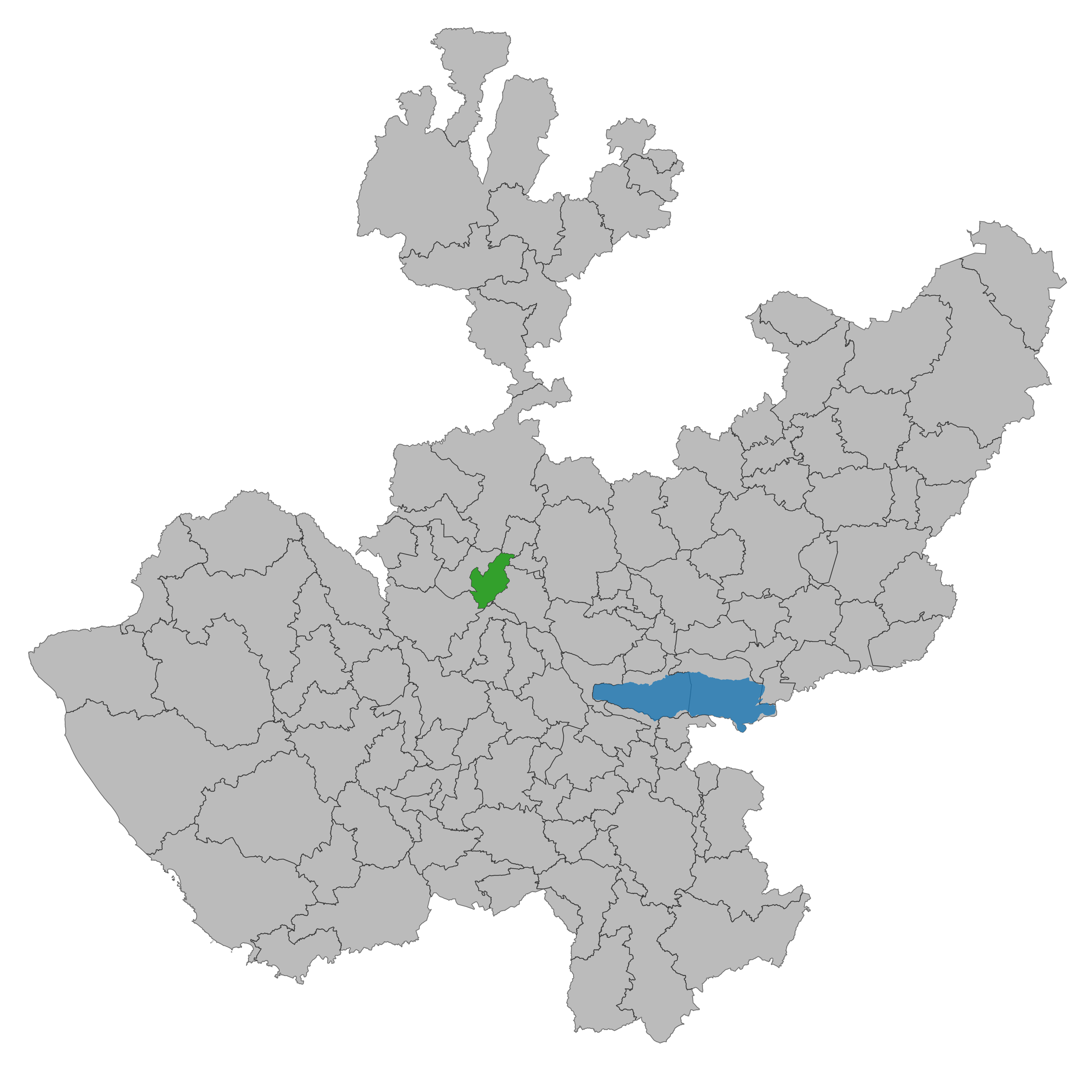
- Location of the municipality in Jalisco

- Location in Mexico Teuchitlán (Jalisco)
- Coordinates: 20°41′N 103°51′W
- Country: Mexico
- State: Jalisco

Area
  - Total: 219.1 km^{2} (84.6 sq mi)
  - Town: 1.35 km^{2} (0.52 sq mi)

Population (2020 census)
  - Total: 9,647
  - Density: 44.03/km^{2} (114.0/sq mi)
  - Town: 3,950
  - Town density: 2,930/km^{2} (7,580/sq mi)
- Time zone: UTC-6 (Central Standard Time)

Teuchitlán is a town and municipality in Jalisco, central-western Mexico. The municipality covers an area of 219.1 km^{2} and is 36 mi (58 km) from Guadalajara, the capital city.

As of 2005, the municipality had a total population of 8,361.

Teuchitlán is located near the archeological site of Los Guachimontones, associated with the pre-Columbian Teuchitlán culture.

On 5 March 2025, groups searching for missing persons in Mexico found an extermination site containing 200 pairs of shoes, personal belongings, apparent human bones, and three crematoriums in Rancho Izaguirre, about 4.5 km (2.8 mi) southeast of Teuchitlán. Members of the New Generation Jalisco Cartel allegedly used it as a confinement, training, and extermination center. State authorities had secured the ranch in September 2024.
