= National Search Commission =

Mexican commission for finding missing persons

The National Search Commission (CNB) is a Mexican commission which was established in 2018 for the purpose of finding the more than 100,000 missing people in Mexico, who have been victims of extrajudicial killings, torture and enforced disappearances. Often, the victim's body is burned in an attempt to ("enforce disappearance") destroy all evidence.

== History ==
The commission was established in 2018 and the commissioner at the helm was Karla Quintana from February 2019 until her resignation in August 2023. The commission has a budget of $22 million and a staff of 89 as of December 2020.

Over 1000 clandestine mass graves have been found in Mexico and families are often tasked with having to investigate missing persons without much help from the Mexican Police. The National Search Commission has worked with forensic teams and in 2022, were searching through thousands of human remains in Nuevo Laredo, at a place authorities call a cartel 'extermination' site.

According to the Human Rights Watch, Mexico has had a history of extrajudicial killings, torture, and "enforced disappearances", which began during the Mexican Dirty War when an estimated 1,200 people disappeared. The disappearances were carried out by Mexico's government forces.

This has continued throughout the Mexican drug war, with drug cartels and organized crime groups perpetrating the crimes, sometimes with help from the police. The war on drugs is a global campaign, led by the U.S. federal government, of drug prohibition, military aid, and military intervention, with the aim of reducing the illegal drug trade in the United States.

The commission's main responsibility is accounting for and finding Mexico's missing people. The number of missing people ranged from 79,000 in 2020, to 92,000 in 2021. On February 28, 2022, the Associated Press stated the official number was 98,356 and other sources estimated there were nearly 100,000 missing. By May, 2022, the number was officially at more than 100,000.

In April 2022, the Commission stated there are more than 20,000 missing women and that half of those women are from Nuevo León. a state in the Northeast region of Mexico.

== Duties of the CNB ==
The functions of the National Search Commission include creating a record of the missing, and working with teams to find the missing.

== See also ==
- Human Rights
- 2014 Iguala mass kidnapping
- 2012 Nuevo Laredo massacres
