= Santa Cruz de las Flores, Tlajomulco de Zúñiga, Jalisco =

Santa Cruz de las Flores
- Town
- Location within Jalisco Location within Mexico
- Coordinates: 20.4806°N 103.5028°W
- Country: Mexico
- State: Jalisco
- Municipality: Tlajomulco de Zúñiga

Area
  - Total: 4.54 km^{2} (1.75 sq mi)

Population (2020 census)
  - Total: 12,233
  - Density: 2,690/km^{2} (6,980/sq mi)
- Time zone: UTC-6 (Zona Centro)

Santa Cruz de las Flores is a town located in the municipality of Tlajomulco de Zúñiga, in the Mexican state of Jalisco. It has been called Xochitlan, meaning "Place of Flowers" (xōchitl is Nahuatl for flower).

== History ==
In this village there is a chapel-hospital, built between the 16th and 18th centuries, with a façade baroque Regional. This is one of the greatest treasures of art in Jalisco, and is in the Ruta Franciscana.

Which houses the Club Deportivo Cardinals with a rich history over the years and Soccer leagues Guadalajara area and regional leagues.

Santa Cruz is one of the fastest-growing towns in the municipality of Tlajomulco de Zuniga, a town with an influx urbanization in recent years through a transition from a village to a local metropolitan area, due to growth area, and its various businesses, subdivisions, shopping centers as well as the remodeling of the streets. Today already has direct truck route to Guadalajara for better comfort.

== Medicine ==
For decades, the people of Santa Cruz de las Flores have developed home remedies. Farmacia Camino Real is one of the few pharmacies in Santa Cruz de las Flores where you can find modern medicine.
