= Tlajomulco de Zúñiga =

- City and municipality
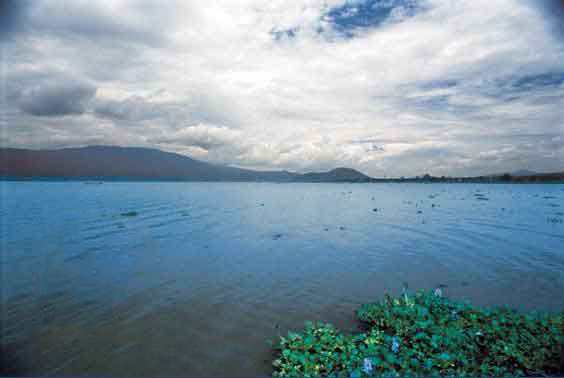

- Coat of arms

- Location of the municipality in Jalisco

- Location in Mexico Tlajomulco de Zúñiga (Mexico)
- Coordinates: 20°28′25″N 103°26′35″W
- Country: Mexico
- State: Jalisco

Area
  - Municipality: 674 km^{2} (260 sq mi)
  - City: 8.54 km^{2} (3.30 sq mi)
- Elevation: 1,585 m (5,200 ft)

Population (2020 census)
  - Municipality: 727,750
  - Density: 1,080/km^{2} (2,800/sq mi)
  - City: 44,103
  - City density: 5,160/km^{2} (13,400/sq mi)
- Time zone: UTC-6 (Central Standard Time)
- Website: https://www.tlajomulco.gob.mx/

Tlajomulco de Zúñiga is the municipal seat and third most populous city in the municipality of the same name, located in the state of Jalisco in central-western Mexico. It forms part of the Guadalajara metropolitan area, lying to the southeast of it. The municipality covers an area of 636.93 km^{2}. As of 2010 it had a population of 416,626, with a total urban population of 378,965.

Its name is interpreted from Nahuatl as "Land in the Corner."

As it is part of the Guadalajara metropolitan area, it has an industrial base and is a large commercial area. Guadalajara International Airport is located in the municipality.

== Towns and villages ==
The municipality has the distinction of being the only one in Mexico with seven cities (localities) of over 25,000 inhabitants. It is also the only one with 20 localities of over 10,000 inhabitants. (Tijuana Municipality, Baja California and Chalco Municipality, State of Mexico both have nine.) The largest localities (cities, towns, and villages) are:

Name	2020 Census Population
Hacienda Santa Fe	139,174
San Agustín	49,402
Tlajomulco de Zúñiga	44,103
Lomas del Sur	37,146
Santa Cruz del Valle	30,849
San Sebastián el Grande	28,770
Fraccionamiento Villas de la Hacienda	28,276
Fraccionamiento La Nueva Esperanza II	23,735
Fraccionamiento Real del Valle (El Paraíso)	20,465
El Capulín	20,078
Cajititlán	17,818
Colinas del Roble	17,163
La Tijera	16,176
Lomas de San Agustín	14,616
Valle Dorado Inn	13,037
Santa Cruz de las Flores	12,233
Total Municipality	727,750

== Toponymy ==
The name Tlajomulco comes from the Nahuatl tlalli (land), xomulli (corner) and co (place), which is interpreted as: "Land in the corner".

== History ==
The area was conquered in 1530 by Nuño de Guzmán at the same time that the Indians of Tonalá were conquered. During the Viceroyalty of New Spain it was divided into the district of Nueva Galicia and was composed almost completely of the indigenous people who in turn were peasants.

During the following century it changed administrative functions and not until the 27 July 1939 did it get the name Tlajomulco de Zúñiga in honor of General Eugenio Zúñiga (native of Tlajomulco), and was converted into a leading municipality.

Its historical background dates back to the time when the Nahua people were here. The region of Tlajomulco belonged to the lordship of Tonallan and the inhabitants were called Tlajomulcas. In 1266, during the time of the King Tlajomulpilli, the town became powerful, dominating what today is known as Tala, Acatlán and other nearby towns. Tlajomulco was founded with the authority of Lord De Tonalá, in appreciation to Pitláloc, Copaya, Pilili and Totoch, for resisting the invasion of the Purépecha. In the first half of the 16th century, Coyotl being a tyrant, suppressed the people of Cuyutlán, Cuescomatitlán, Cajititlán, Atlixtac (Santa Anita) and Xuchitlán, with fees until in 1530 it was conquered by Nuño Beltrán de Guzmán, who upon arriving in Tlajomulco was well received by the tyrant Coyotl, who he helped in the conquest of Tonalá. The tyrant was baptized this same year and supported Nuño Beltrán de Guzmán and was called Pedro de Guzmán.

Seventeen plastic bags with human remains were found in colonia Chulavista in January 2021. In 2025, María del Carmen Morales, a madre buscadora searching for her missing son, was murdered alongside her other son by unknown gunmen.

== Government ==
=== Municipal presidents ===
Term	Municipal president	Political party	Notes
1915	Everardo Lares		
1915	Marcos Gutiérrez		
1915	Jesús Zúñiga		
1915	Honorato González		
1915	Roberto Graciano		
1916	Jesús Zúñiga		
1916	Roberto Graciano		
1917	Roberto Graciano		
1918	Manuel Flores Trigo		
1918	Guadalupe Cortés		
1919	Luis García Villegas		
1919	Jesús Sánchez Guerrero		
1920	José Eleno Gámez		
1920	Agustín Pineda		
1920	Hermenegildo Márquez		
1920	Salvador Alcaraz		
1920	Pascual Mendoza		
1921	Carlos Alcaraz Aguilar		
1922	Damián G. Sandoval		
1923	Heliodoro Mondragón		
1923	Andrés Gómez Tacalo		
1924	Alfredo Ortiz		
1924	Idelfonso Barocio		
1925	Blas Fernández Ibarra		
1926	Pedro González Covarrubias		
1926	Juvencio Rodríguez		
1926	José Zepeda Fonseca		
1926	Brígido Díaz Ocaranza		
1927	Brígido Díaz Ocaranza		
1928	Luis García Villegas		
1928	Sabino Aguilar Rivera		
1929	Juan Bugarini Márquez		
1930	Julio Díaz Ávila	PNR	
1931	David Tejeda Márquez	PNR	
1932	Guillermo Díaz Ávila	PNR	
1932	Isidro B. Trigo	PNR	
1933	Alejandro Carmona	PNR	
1933	Leocadio Gabriel	PNR	
1934	Porfirio Díaz Vidaurri	PNR	
1934	Apolinar Lares	PNR	
1935	Ignacio Esquivel	PNR	
1935	Inocencio Guzmán Flores	PNR	
1935	Inocencio Guzmán Flores	PNR	
1936	Anselmo Altamirano	PNR	
1937	Anselmo Altamirano	PNR	
1937	Felipe Quezada	PNR	
1938	Primitivo Casillas	PNR	
1938	José Fonseca	PRM	
1939	Juan Fierros López	PRM	
1940	Heriberto Rivas Pérez	PRM	
1941-1942	Francisco S. Miranda	PRM	
1943-1944	Antonio García Sosa	PRM	
1945-1946	Porfirio Díaz Vidaurri	PRM; PRI	
1947-1948	Silviano García Ortiz	PRI	
1949-1951	Jesús Sánchez Magaña	PRI	
1952	Pedro Rodríguez Rentaría	PRI	
1953	Francisco Robles Ocampo	PRI	
1954-1955	Pedro Parra Centeno	PRI	
1956-1957	Narciso García Totolapa	PRI	
1958	Cipriano García	PRI	
1959-1961	José Eladio China Guevara	PRI	
1962-1964	Pedro Parra Centeno	PRI	
1965-1967	Eliseo Zepeda China	PRI	
1968-1970	José Refugio China Guevara	PRI	
1971-1973	Epigmenio Riestra Esquivel	PRI	
1974-1976	Roberto Villegas Gutiérrez	PRI	
1977-1979	José Luis Barrera Gómez	PRI	
1980	Tranquilino Velasco Sánchez	PRI	
1981-1982	Amparo Ureña Vidal de Villegas	PRI	
1983-1985	Ernesto Díaz Márquez	PRI	
1986-1988	Jaime Enrique Michel Velasco	PRI	
1989	Benjamín Saavedra Martínez	PRI	
1990-1992	Juan Hernández Rosales	PRI	
1992-1995	Antonio Sánchez Ramírez	PRI	
1995-1997	Manuel Guzmán de la Torre	PAN	
1998-2000	Ernesto Díaz Márquez	PRI	
2001-2003	Guillermo Sánchez Magaña	PRI	
01/01/2004-31/12/2006	Andrés Zermeño Barba	PAN	
01/01/2007-31/12/2009	Antonio Tatengo Ureña	PAN	
01/01/2010-31/12/2011	Enrique Alfaro Ramírez	PRD	Applied for a temporary leave, to run for the state government
01/01/2012-30/09/2012	Alberto Uribe Camacho	PRD	Acting municipal president
01/10/2012-27/02/2015	Ismael del Toro Castro	PT; MC	He applied for a temporary leave, to run for the deputation in the local electoral district 7 of Jalisco, which he got
28/02/2015-2015	Lucio Miranda Robles	PT; MC	Acting municipal president
01/10/2015-28/02/2018	Alberto Uribe Camacho	MC (External candidate)	He applied for a temporary leave
01/03/2018-15/07/2018	Carlos Jaramillo Gómez	MC	Acting municipal president
16/07/2018-30/09/2018	Alberto Uribe Camacho	Morena	He moved to Morena political party in February 2018. Resumed
01/10/2018-28/02/2021	Salvador Zamora Zamora	MC	Applied for a temporary leave, to run for reelection
01/03/2021-2021	César Francisco Padilla Chávez	MC	Acting municipal president
2021-2024	Salvador Zamora Zamora	MC	He was reelected on 06/06/2021
2024- Present	Gerardo Quirino Velázquez Chávez	MC	Current municipal president

== Notable residents ==
- María del Carmen Morales (1982–2025), Mexican human rights activist who was murdered while searching for her missing son.
