= Jalisco extermination camp =

Concentration camp in Mexico

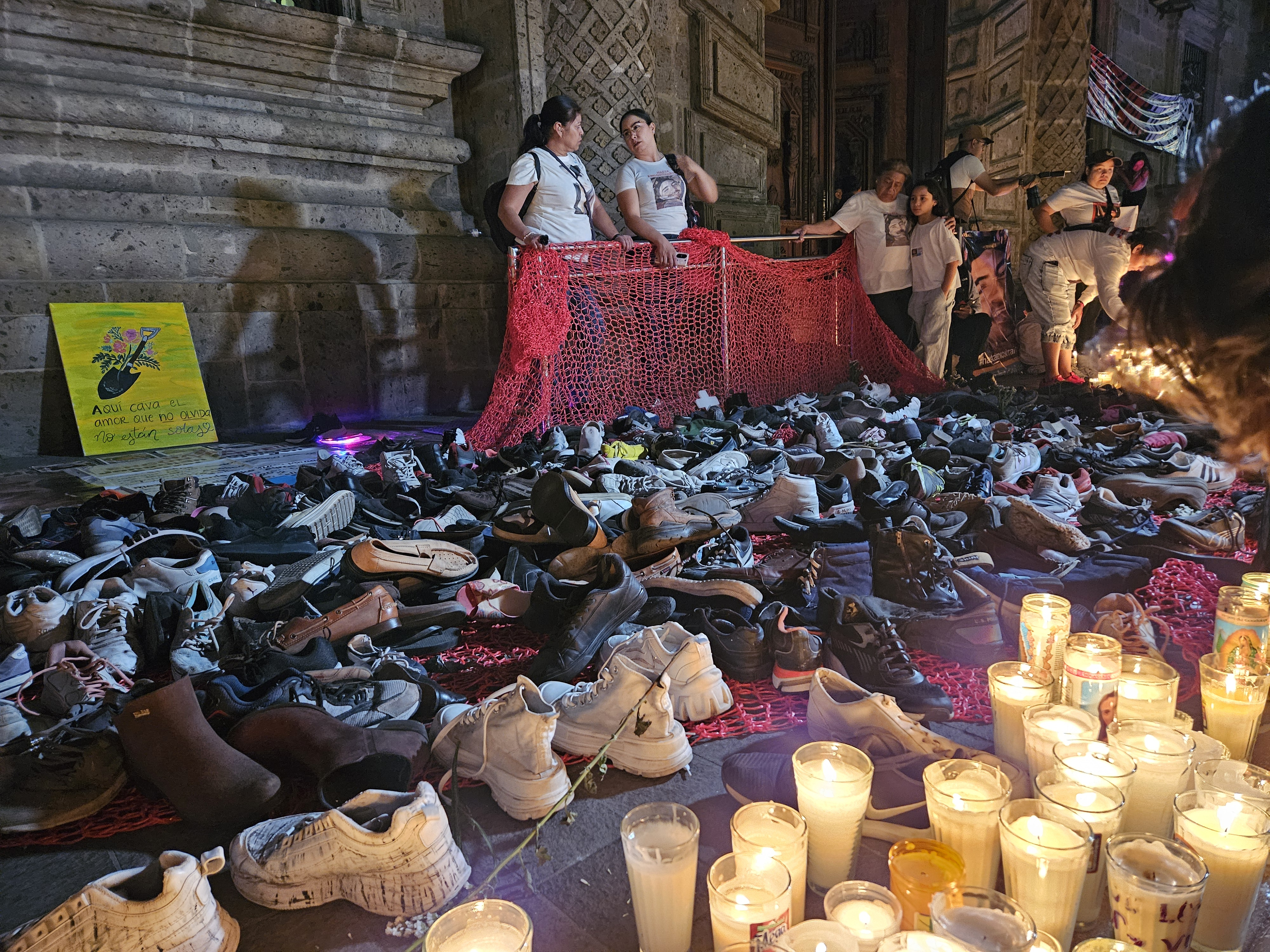
- Vigil held in Guadalajara for the victims

- Location within Jalisco

General information
- Type: Concentration camp Training compound
- Location: Izaguirre Ranch; Teuchitlán, Jalisco, Mexico
- Coordinates: 20.656761°N 103.816292°W

The Jalisco extermination camp was a forced recruitment and training center located at Rancho Izaguirre in Teuchitlán, Jalisco, Mexico. Operated by the Jalisco New Generation Cartel, it has been referred to as an extermination center, a concentration camp, and "the little school of terror". On 24 March 2025, Omar García Harfuch, head of the Secretariat of Security and Citizen Protection (SSPC), stated that the site served exclusively as a training center.

The site was discovered on 5 March 2025 after an activist group dedicated to searching for missing persons received an anonymous tip.

== Life in the camp ==
=== Recruitment and arrival ===
Recruiters allegedly posted fake job advertisements on social media to attract applicants. These listings typically offered security guard positions with weekly salaries ranging from MX$4,000 to MX$12,000 (around US$200 to US$600). Applicants were instructed to gather at designated bus terminals, where they were transported to Izaguirre Ranch. While some listings advertised positions within the Jalisco New Generation Cartel, many survivors reported that they were unaware of the organization's involvement until they arrived at the ranch.

Upon arrival at Rancho Izaguirre, applicants were allegedly required to surrender their belongings, including their phones.

=== Training ===
Training for new recruits generally lasted approximately one month. After completing their paramilitary training, recruits were assigned roles within the organization based on their abilities. They were then deployed to different states to support the cartel's operations.

Survivors reported that those deemed to be "lacking the aptitudes", as well as those who failed in training, resisted, or attempted to escape, were tortured and killed as a form of punishment and as a warning to other recruits.

== Discovery ==
On 20 September 2024, the National Guard and the Jalisco State Prosecutor's Office raided Izaguirre Ranch, securing the property and rescuing two kidnapped individuals. Authorities also arrested ten people and seized several firearms; however, they did not report finding a training camp, crematoriums, mass graves, or human remains.

Following an anonymous tip about a possible mass grave on the ranch, the Buscadores Guerreros de Jalisco Collective, an activist group dedicated to searching for missing persons, arrived at the site on 5 March 2025 to investigate. During their search, the group discovered approximately 200 pairs of shoes, hundreds of items of clothing, three makeshift crematoriums, and charred human remains.

=== Reactions ===
==== Domestic ====
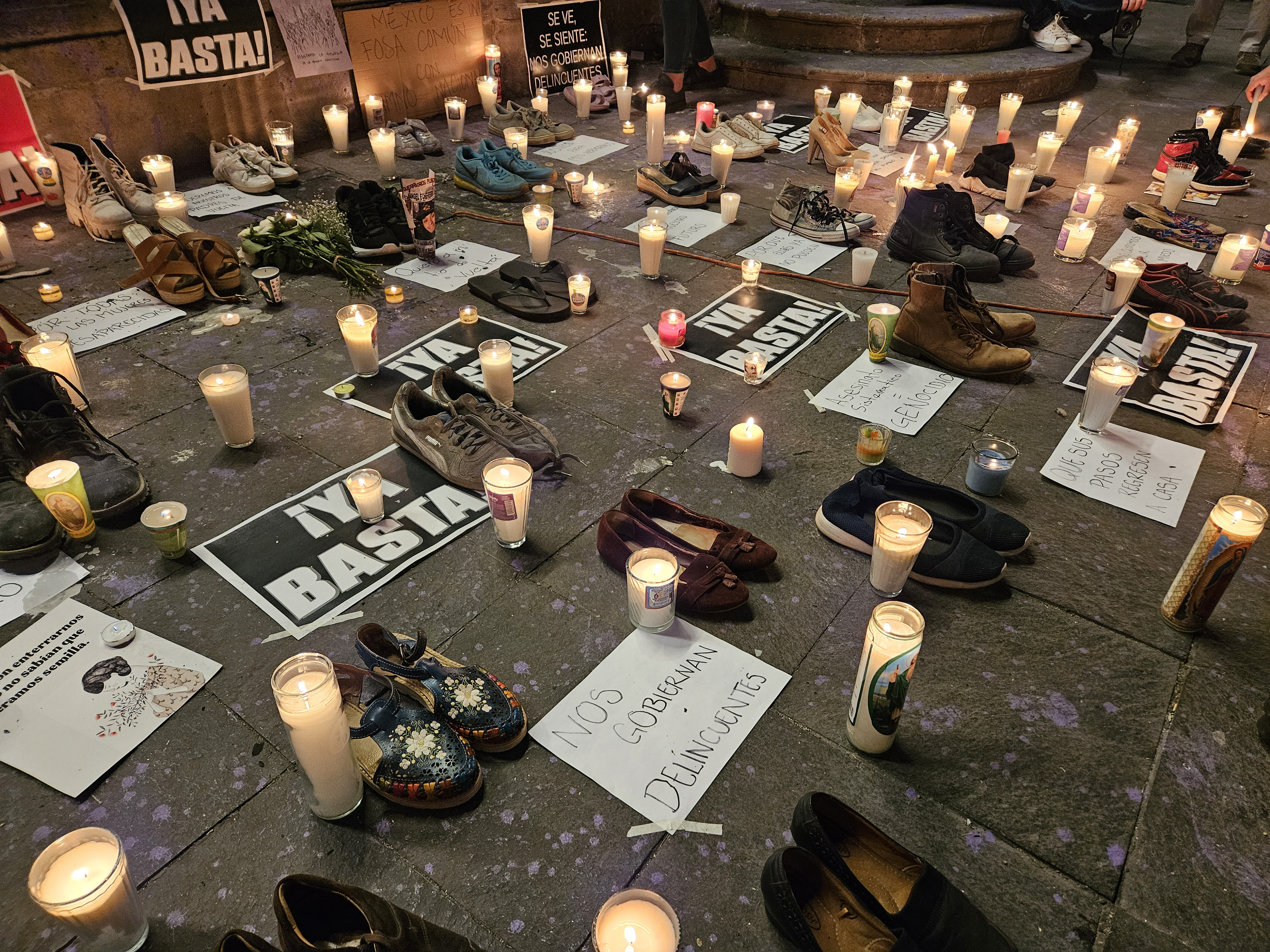
Protests in Guadalajara, Jalisco

On 10 March, President Claudia Sheinbaum described the findings as "terrible" and stated that both the governor of Jalisco and the federal Secretariat of Security and Citizen Protection were addressing the case.

On the afternoon of 15 March, civic organizations and citizens held vigils in at least 24 public squares to protest and demand justice.

On 17 March, President of the Senate Gerardo Fernández Noroña downplayed the findings, stating that the evidence—including the 200 pairs of shoes—might not be authentic and did not necessarily indicate a case of forced disappearances. He accused the media and the opposition of orchestrating a "vile and infamous coup campaign" against Sheinbaum's government and Morena.

On 20 March, Senator Marko Cortés (PAN) proposed the creation of an interdisciplinary team of national and international experts to investigate the events at Izaguirre Ranch. However, the Senate session was adjourned prematurely after senators from Morena, the Ecologist Green Party of Mexico (PVEM), and the Labor Party (PT), led by Senator Adán Augusto López (Morena), walked out. On 25 March, the motion failed in a 31–61 vote.

==== International ====
United States Republican congressman Riley Moore compared the situation to "something we had previously only associated with Nazi death camps like Auschwitz".

The Inter-American Commission on Human Rights issued a press release on 27 March 2025 calling on Mexico to strengthen its efforts to investigate the site, identify victims, and hold those responsible accountable. The commission described the state's search efforts as "deficient".

== Investigations ==
=== State investigation ===
Following the seizure of Izaguirre Ranch by the National Guard and the Jalisco State Prosecutor's Office on 20 September 2024, the latter launched an investigation into the site after the Attorney General's Office (FGR) declined to take over the case. The investigation included charges of firearm possession and enforced disappearance but did not include organized crime, a charge that falls outside the jurisdiction of state prosecutors and can only be investigated by the FGR.

After search collectives discovered Izaguirre Ranch, Attorney General Alejandro Gertz raised concerns about alleged irregularities in the state's investigation on 19 March. These included the failure to collect or identify fingerprints at the scene, improper identification and documentation of evidence such as abandoned clothing and footwear, the lack of a full site inspection, inadequate processing of vehicles—three of which were later identified as stolen—and the delayed involvement of the FGR in matters involving high-caliber firearms and organized crime. Gertz also stated that, six months later, Jalisco's forensic services had not released a definitive report establishing the age and identity of the remains found at the site.

On the same day, Gertz accused the Jalisco State Prosecutor's Office of failing to submit all relevant forensic reports and documents to the FGR, delaying the transfer of the case. The following day, the Jalisco State Prosecutor's Office sent the investigation files to the FGR.

=== Federal investigation ===
On 24 March 2025, Secretary of Security Omar García Harfuch, announced the arrest of José Gregorio Lastra Hermida, also known as "El Comandante Lastra," an alleged leader of the Jalisco New Generation Cartel. Lastra was apprehended in Mexico City and accused of overseeing forced recruitment and training operations at Izaguirre Ranch between May 2024 and March 2025. According to authorities, he abducted individuals to train them for criminal activities; those who resisted or attempted to escape were reportedly tortured or killed. Authorities also dismantled 39 websites allegedly used by the CJNG to recruit individuals under false pretenses.

In April 2025, Attorney General of Mexico Alejandro Gertz Manero stated that the ranch was used as a recruitment site rather than an extermination site, saying that executions had not been carried out systematically. Authorities also stated that the existence of cremation facilities at the site had been ruled out. Gertz said that analyses conducted by the National Autonomous University of Mexico (UNAM) of soil, rock, and construction material found no evidence of temperatures reaching 200°C; cremation generally requires temperatures of approximately 800°C.

On 3 May 2025, José Murguía Santiago, the mayor of Teuchitlán, was arrested on charges of organized crime and forced disappearance. The Attorney General's Office alleged that he was aware of the ranch's existence, used municipal resources to support its operation, and received monthly payments of MX$70,000.

== See also ==
- Mexican drug war
