= Missing persons in Mexico =

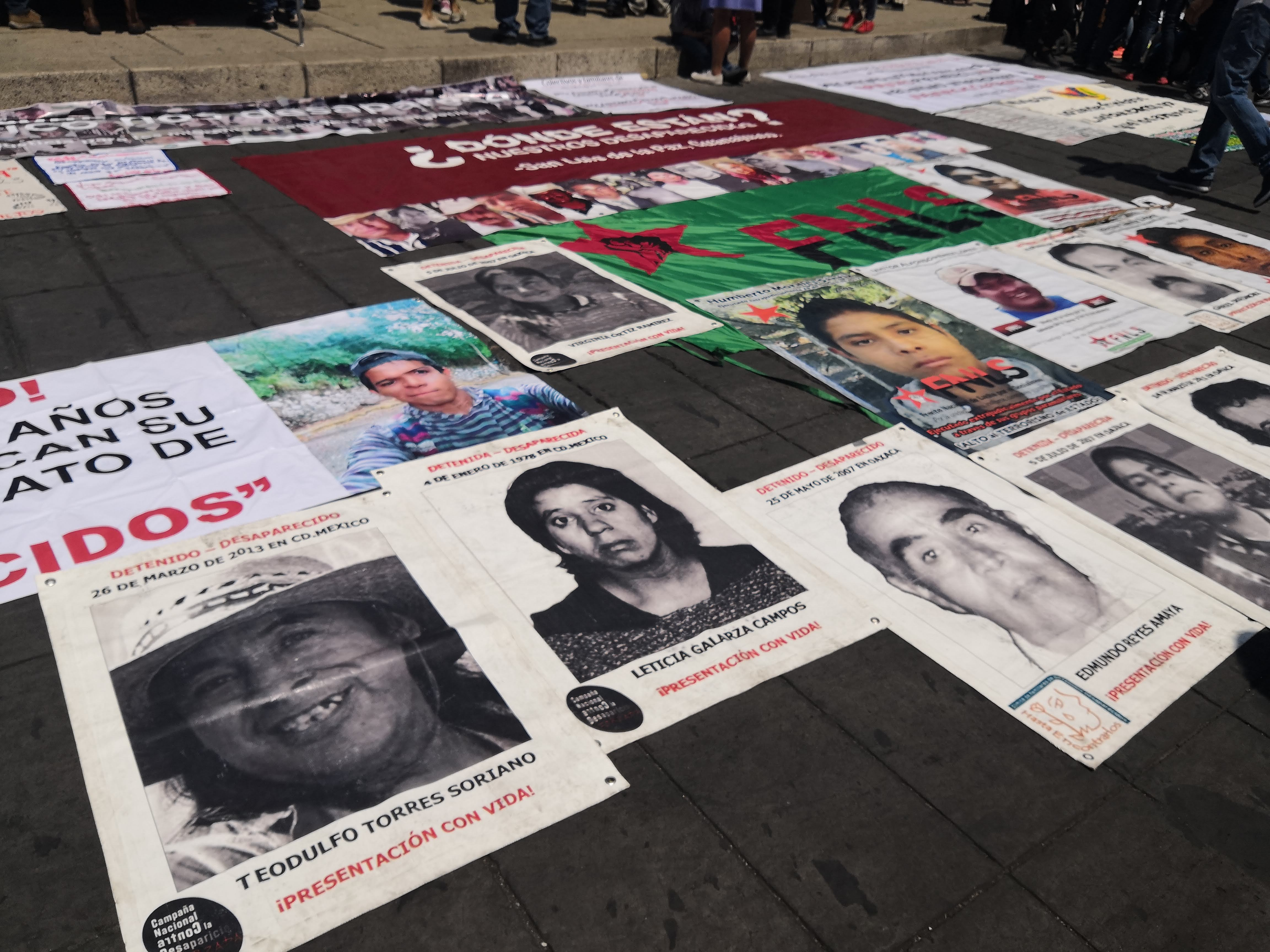
Missing persons posters at a madres buscadoras event.

Disappearances and missing person cases in Mexico have remained a pressing social and political issue within the country since the 2000s.

Searches for missing people have been complicated by politics, corruption, and other bureaucratic and societal factors. Societal demand to investigate disappearances has made missing people a pertinent issue in both national and local Mexican elections. In particular, concerns that the Mexican government is undercounting the number of missing persons, or covering up disappearances, have drawn both national and international concern from groups such as the United Nations and Human Rights Watch.

== Statistics ==
According to the International Commission on Missing Persons, 111,521 persons had been reported missing in Mexico as of 21 September 2023. Approximately 75% of missing persons are men, and 25% are women. Missing persons cases are highest in the states of Estado de Mexico, Jalisco and Tamaulipas; Nuevo León has the highest number of missing persons cases per capita. In 2023, the Mexican government stated that according to their records, there are 12,377 missing persons cases in the country, following a 2023 review of cases. In March 2026, a report released by the Mexican government identified around 130,000 missing persons cases, but stated they believed this was an overcount.

Between 2006 and 2023, approximately 5,600 clandestine graves have been identified in the country. By 2018, clandestine graves had been identified in 24 states.

== Causes ==
Missing persons cases in Mexico have primarily been driven by two actors: the government and police, through enforced disappearances, and drug cartels. In 2013 and 2018, two waves of disappearances were connected to the Mexican Navy.

A 2024 study of missing persons cases in Nuevo León found that the "main factors of vulnerability [to going missing] are structural violence, mental health and addictions, gender violence and police abuse". Mexican advocates have expressed concern that the government focuses more on investigating the disappearances of foreigners compared to Mexican citizens. Migrants who go missing while working in or traveling through Mexico face even more obstacles.

=== Unidentified bodies ===
One aspect of the missing persons crisis is a "forensic crisis" of unidentified bodies, attributed to lack of resources and funding given to morgues. Due to lack of space in morgues, bodies have in some cases been stored in refrigerator trucks. According to the project A dónde van los desaparecidos, the Forensic Medical Service (SEMEFO) registered 72,172 unidentified bodies in morgues between 2006 and 2023. Of those, 34,699 date to between 2019 and 2023.

On the other hand, some bodies are identified, but relatives are never informed, learning of their loved one's death only when accessing reports or files themselves.

== History ==
=== 20th century ===
Mexico began keeping records on missing persons in 1962.

Estimates of disappearance during the Mexican Dirty War (1964–1987) vary, with various reports estimating 517, 797, 1,000, and 1,200 people disappeared. Guerrero was particularly hard hit, with a 2006 report estimating more than 600 missing people during the Dirty War. Disappearances are difficult to number with certainty, as disappearances in rural areas may not have been registered, and some family members may have been too scared of authorities to report a loved one missing. Those who went missing during the Dirty War did not have a single point of commonality, but included activists (including students and teachers), guerrillas, protesters, relatives or supporters of activist or guerilla movements, drug traffickers, and simple civilians living in areas of intense conflict.

=== 21st century ===
Between August 2004 and January 2005, 27 American citizens disappeared in the area around Nuevo Laredo, Tamaulipas. In 2006, the Mexican government declared a war on drug cartels, which has led to increased violence and rates of disappearances.

Between 2008 and 2009, Ciudad Juárez, Chihuahua, saw 347 reports of missing women; 18 cases were still active by March 2009. Local activists criticized officials for saying the majority of missing women had left voluntarily. Missing persons cases were a pressing problem in Juárez through 2012.

Between 2006 and 2012, at least 24,102 unidentified bodies were buried in graves across the country.

In September 2014, 43 students from Ayotzinapa Rural Normal School were abducted and disappeared in Iguala, Guerrero, in an event known as the Iguala mass kidnapping. The event brought the issue of missing persons into the Mexican public consciousness, giving faces and names to the issue. Those searching for the students in the following months uncovered the remains of 130 people previously reported missing.

In early 2018, the United Nations suggested the Mexican Navy had disappeared at least 23 people, including five minors, in Tamaulipas. According to residents, many of the disappearances occurred during a "rampage" by Marines after cartel gunmen attacked three Navy patrols on Palm Sunday. The navy later released a statement that "it would cooperate with all investigations".

In 2021, over 100 people went missing on the 124-mile long stretch of road from the cities of Monterrey to Nuevo Laredo, earning it the nickname the "highway of death". In 2022, the official number of missing persons cases grew to over 100,000, the first time this had occurred since record keeping began in 1962.

In March 2024, nearly 70 people were kidnapped across the La Noria region of Sinaloa; by 24 March, Mexican authorities announced having rescued 42 people. By 23 April, the state of Nuevo León reported 42 people had been kidnapped in the previous month, seven of whom remained unaccounted for. The kidnappings in both states were attributed to criminal groups.

In March 2025, on the Izaguirre Ranch in the state of Jalisco, 200 pairs of shoes and a crematorium were discovered by a group searching for missing relatives.

In April 2026, the United Nations Committee on Enforced Disappearances (CED) published a decision in which they stated that "enforced disappearances" were being committed in Mexico at a systematic level, although they did stress they did not find evidence of federal policy contributing to this through "deliberate action or deliberate omission". The Mexican government rejected the report as "biased and dismissive of the observations, analysis, and updates submitted by the Mexican Government," saying the report did not consider data after 2017 and was limited in regional scope. In May 2026, a report released by the Inter-American Commission on Human Rights (IACHR), summarizing a "sweeping investigation," stated that although organized crime is responsible for the "vast majority" of disappearances, "many of the disappearances committed by organized crime occur in deep collusion and coordination with state agents". This involvement ranged from ignoring or neglecting abductions to authorities abducting individuals without warrants and handing them off to organized crime groups. In some regions of the country, disappearances caused by government officials matched the rate of those caused by criminals.

== Political response ==
Since 2006, with the advent of the Mexican drug war, many authorities have suggested that missing people were connected to drug cartels, and thus are criminals who do not deserve a proper investigation.

The National Search Commission was established in 2018 to search for and locate disappeared and missing people.

2018 also marked the election of President Andrés Manuel López Obrador, who consistently clashed with missing persons activists on how to approach the problem of missing persons. In May 2024, he suggested that searchers for missing persons were suffering "a delirium of necrophilia" after they brought attention to a site in Mexico City thought to be a clandestine crematorium.

In June 2023, the government announced a review of registered missing persons cases. Missing persons activists criticized the decision, fearing that without transparency the review would be used to artificially lower the number of missing persons. Activist outrage continued when the government released the results of the review, saying they could confirm only 12,377 missing persons cases out of an original 113,000 cases. The government explained that 16,681 of the cases had actually been solved, with the missing person having been found alive or dead, and that the remaining cases lacked enough information to mount a search.

In March 2026, the government released a report suggesting that about a third (40,367) of the approximately 130,000 missing persons cases had indications of signs of life. This number was compiled by "cross-referencing things like vaccination records, birth and marriage registries and tax filings". This method was used to mark 5,269 people as found. However, the majority of these cases were "voluntary disappearances," such as men leaving their wife for another partner, or women fleeing domestic violence. Meanwhile, 43,128 cases showed no activity in government records. The method was not able to be used with the remaining 46,000 cases, due to missing data such as full names or dates of birth. Activists and human rights groups criticized the report, saying it minimized government responsibility, and called for more transparency in the government's methodology. They also expressed concern that the government would not continue to investigate the 46,000 cases with less complete data.

== Advocates for missing people ==
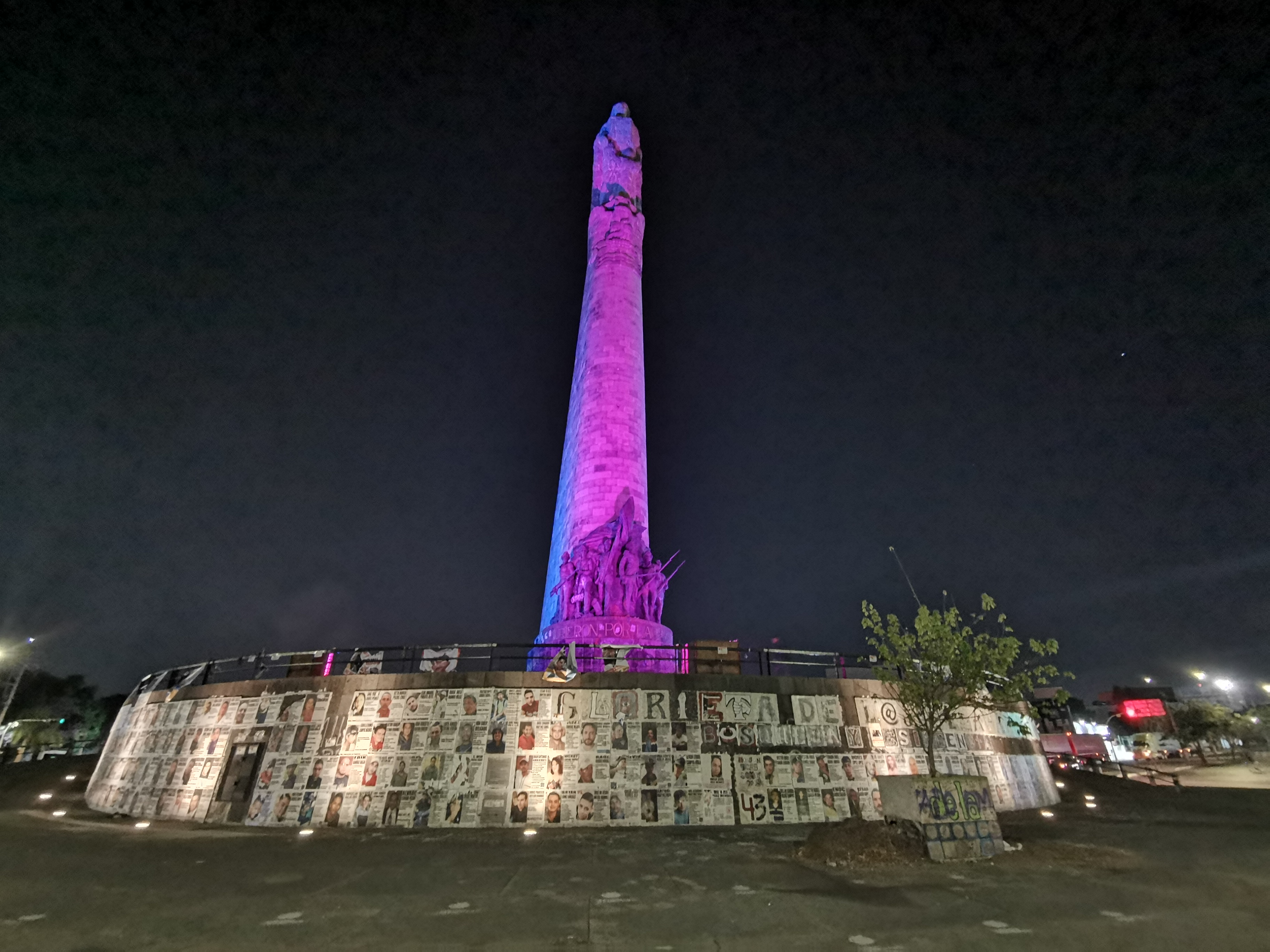
The Glorieta de las y los Desaparecidos in Guadalajara

A number of women have become advocates for the missing and disappeared in Mexico, referring to themselves as madres buscadoras or "searching mothers". Mexican activists who have worked to investigate disappearances have faced multiple challenges, and some have been disappeared or killed themselves, such as Sandra Domínguez and Sandra Luz Hernández. In 2019, Human Rights Watch described such advocates as a "moral authority", who could oppose governmental efforts to characterize missing people as criminals.

=== Strategies ===
Activists have employed various strategies to attempt to locate the remains of missing people, such as using drones to find disturbed ground that may indicate clandestine graves.

In February 2022, advocates organized a march in honor of the country's missing and disappeared. Advocates also mounted marches in Mexico City and other cities on 30 August 2023, the International Day of the Disappeared.

Many family members have refused to honor their missing relatives at Day of the Dead celebrations, waiting until they receive undeniable proof that the relative is dead.

== See also ==
- Enforced disappearance
- Mexican drug war
- Crime in Mexico
