= Parroquia de San Pedro Apostol =

Parroquia de San Pedro Apostol may refer to:

- Parroquia de San Pedro Apóstol (Tlaquepaque), Jalisco, Mexico
- Parroquia de San Pedro Apostol (Zapopan), Jalisco, Mexico
