= List of municipal presidents of Tlaquepaque =

Following is a list of municipal presidents of Tlaquepaque, in the Mexican state of Jalisco:

Term	Municipal president	Political party	Notes
1857–1861	Santiago García		
1861	Luis Hernández		
1862	Luciano Martínez		
1862	Reyes García		
1862–1863	Martín Manzano		
1863	Reyes García		
1863	Martín Manzano		
1863–1867	Julián González		
1868	José María Zúñiga		
1869	Eligio Zúñiga		
1869–1870	Exiquio Cortés		
1870	Andrés Martínez		
1870	Apolonio Ramírez		
1870	Andrés Martínez		
1870	Faustino Preciado		
1870	Andrés Martínez		
1870	Fausto Preciado		
1871–1873	Regino Guillén		
1874–1876	Brigido Rosales		
1876	José G. Azco		
1876	Mateo Gómez		
1877	Jorge Tiznado		
1877	Brígido Rosales		
1877	Amado Goche		
1878	Enrique V. Loza		
1878	José Alemán		
1878–1879	Ramón Gómez		
1880	José Hernán		
1880	Trinidad Hernández		
1880–1881	José María Ivanz Alatorre		
1881	Trinidad Hernández		
1881–1883	José Guarro		
1883	Francisco Muñoz Gutiérrez		
1883	Donato Rosales		
1887	Guadalupe Serratos		
1887	Juan N. Curiel		
1887–1888	Guadalupe Serratos		
1888	Luis Medina		
1888	Ramón A. Alatorre		
1888–1890	J. Macías Gutiérrez		
1890	J. Hernández		
1890–1891	L. G. Degollado		
1891	R. Y. Navarro		
1892	Antonio Ortiz Gordoa		
1892–1893	Ignacio G. Ruvalcaba		
1893	Cruz Gómez Bordón		
1893	Adolfo Baldomero Riestra		
1893	José P. Jarero		
1893	Dávalos		
1893	Bernardo Topete		
1894	Cruz Gómez Bordón		
1894	Bernardo Topete		
1894	Manuel Rodríguez		
1895	Antonio Muñana		
1895	Bernardo Topete		
1895	José González		
1895–1896	Antonio Muñana		
1896–1897	Luciano J. Gallardo		
1897	Mariano Jiménez		
1897–1898	Carlos Marrón		
1898–1899	Miguel Y. Morales		
1899–1900	Pedro Zúñiga		
1900	Enrique Barrios de los Ríos		
1900	Roberto Robles		
1902	Luis Navarrete		
1902	Anastasio Gallo		
1902–1905	B. Gómez Cruz		
1905–1907	Rafael del Castillo		
1907–1908	O. Jiménez		
1908	Pedro Cantú		
1908–1910	J. López Portillo Camarena		
1910–1911	Manuel Argaiz		
1911	Maximino Campos		
1911–1912	Jesús Álvarez del Castillo		
1912	Mateo de León		
1912	Egberto de la Mora		
1912–1914	Luis Rubio Luquín		
1914	Alberto Corona		
1914	J. López Portillo Camarena		
1914	Anastasio Gallo		
1914	Jerónimo Sahagún Campos		
1914–1915	Alejandro Aviña		
1915	Samuel Acuña		
1915	Mariano Castellano		
1915	Pedro Patiño Navarro		
1915	Galindo Flores		
1915–1917	Leocadio Muñoz		
1918–1919	Félix G. Acosta		
1919	Fernando Rosas Merino		
1919–1920	Eleuterio Plascencia		
1920	Emilio Trujillo		
1920	Luis Álvarez del Castillo		
1920	Salvador Farías		
1920	¿?		
1921	Gerónimo Sahagún		
1921	Fernando Rosas Merino		
1922–1924	Antonio Sánchez		
1924	I. M. Salcedo		
1924	Juan Panduro		
1924	Graciano Ochoa		
1925–1926	Adrián Morales		
1927–1928	Antonio Sánchez		
1929	N. Ramírez	PNR	
1930	Gerónimo Sahagún	PNR	
1931	Roberto Gómez Vallejo	PNR	
1932	C. G. Rodríguez	PNR	
1933	Gerónimo Sahagún	PNR	
1934	Ignacio Orozco	PNR	
1935–1936	David Mendoza	PNR	
1937	Ignacio Orozco	PNR	
1938–1939	Roberto Gómez Vallejo	PRM	
1940	Fernando Silva	PRM	
1941–1942	Manuel Talamantes	PRM	
1943–1944	Manuel Izquierdo	PRM	
1945	Aurelio G. Ramírez	PRM	
1945	Francisco Talamantes	PRM	
1946	J. Jesús Castellanos	PRI	
1946	J. Cruz Valencia	PRI	
1947–1948	José Loza Sánchez	PRI	
1949–1952	J. Jesús Ruvalcaba	PRI	
1953–1955	Jerónimo Sahagún	PRI	
1956–1957	Anastasio Salas	PRI	
1958	Antonio Gutiérrez Ortiz	PRI	
1959–1961	Rubén Casillas Ramírez	PRI	
1962–1964	Javier Valdivia Hernández	PRI	
01/01/1965–31/12/1967	Simón Sánchez	PRI	
01/01/1968–1970	Lauro Badillo Díaz	PRI	
1970–31/12/1970	J. Guadalupe Gómez de la Torre	PRI	
01/01/1971–31/12/1973	Roberto Neri Rodríguez	PRI	
01/01/1974–31/12/1976	Javier Valdivia Hernández	PRI	
01/01/1977–1979	Marcos Montero Ruiz	PRI	
1979–31/12/1979	Pedro Martínez López	PRI	
01/01/1980–31/12/1982	Salvador Orozco Loreto	PRI	
01/01/1983–1985	Porfirio Cortés Silva	PRI	
1985–31/12/1985	José Isiordia Fierros	PRI	Acting municipal president
01/01/1986–31/12/1988	Arturo Franco Lozano	PRI	
01/01/1989–1991	Alfredo Barba Hernández	PRI	
1991–1992	Salvador Casillas Tostado	PRI	
1992–1995	Eduardo Riverón Gámez	PRI	
1995–1997	Marcos Rosas Romero	PAN	
01/01/1998–31/12/2000	José María Robles Díaz	PAN	
01/01/2001–31/12/2003	José Antonio Álvarez Hernández	PAN	
01/01/2004–31/12/2006	Miguel Castro Reynoso	PRI	
01/01/2007–31/08/2009	José Hernán Cortés Berumen	PAN	
01/09/2009–31/12/2009	María del Rosario Velázquez Hernández	PAN	Acting municipal president
01/01/2010–07/02/2012	Miguel Castro Reynoso	PRI	
07/02/2012–30/09/2012	Marco Antonio González Fierros	PRI	Acting municipal president
01/10/2012–30/09/2015	Alfredo Barba Mariscal	PRI	
01/10/2015–28/03/2018	María Elena Limón García	MC	
28/03/2018–30/09/2018	Mirna Citlalli Amaya de Luna	MC	Acting municipal president
01/10/2018–28/02/2021	María Elena Limón García	MC	She was reelected on 01/07/2018. Her second triennium started 01/10/2018
01/03/2021–30/09/2021	Betsabé Dolores Almaguer Esparza	MC	Acting municipal president
01/10/2021–31/12/2021	Rafael García Íñiguez		President of the Acting Municipal Council. (Mirna Citlalli Amaya de Luna, from the MC party, had been elected on 06/06/2021, but the election was annulled by the Electoral Court of the Federal Judicial Branch [Tribunal Electoral del Poder Judicial de la Federación, TEPJF])
01/01/2022–01/12/2023	Mirna Citlalli Amaya de Luna	MC	Was reelected on 21/11/2021, in extraordinary election. Applied for a temporary leave, to run for reelection
01/12/2023–	Adriana del Carmen Zúñiga Guerrero	MC	Acting municipal president
