= El Señor de los Monitos =

Statue in Tlaquepaque, Jalisco, Mexico

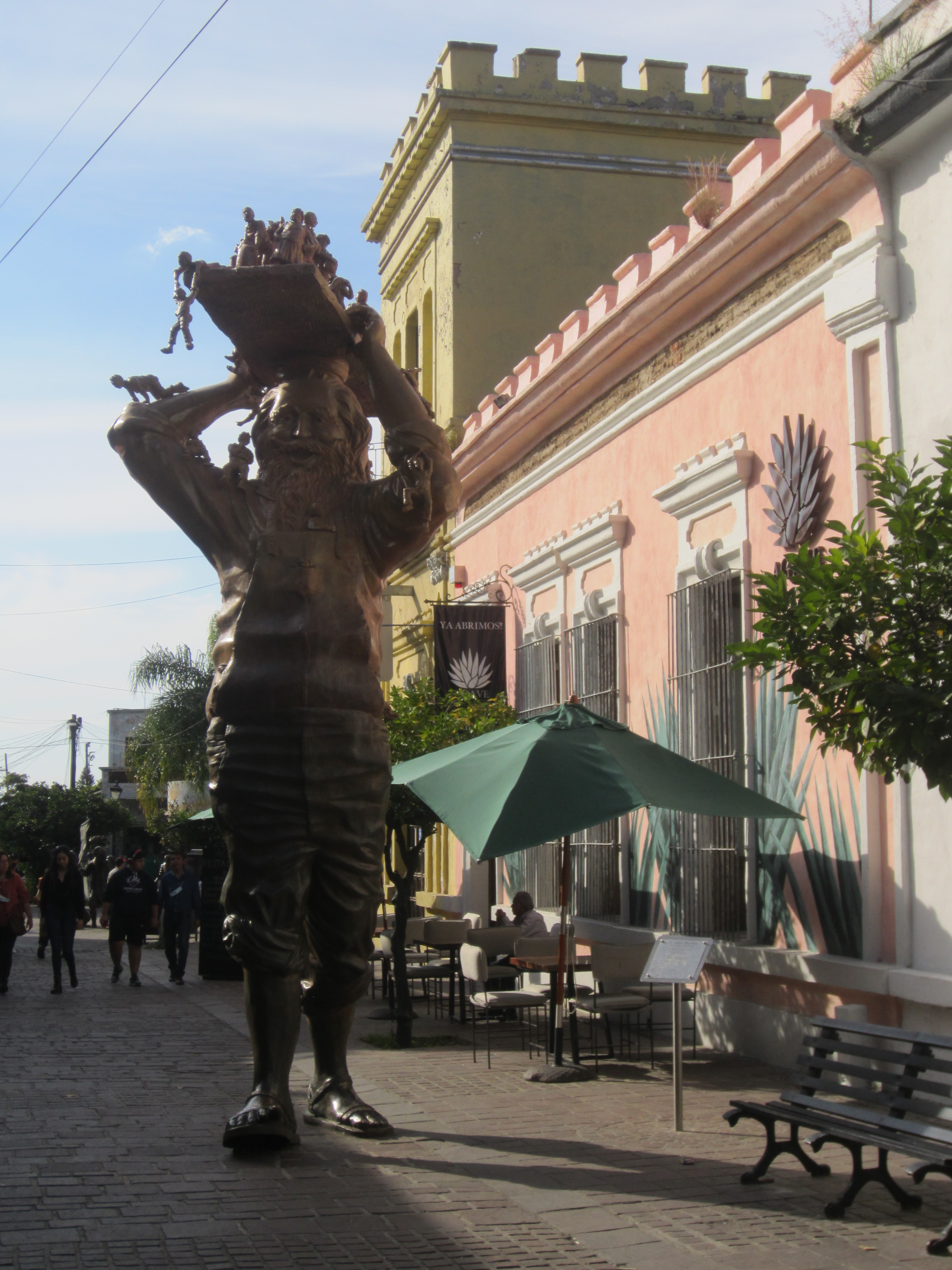
- The statue in 2021
- Artist: Camilo Ramírez
- Year: 2020
- Location: Tlaquepaque, Jalisco, Mexico
- 20.63948°N 103.3155°W

El Señor de los Monitos, or simply El Señor Monitos, is a sculpture in Tlaquepaque, in the Mexican state of Jalisco. Camilo Ramírez made this piece in 2020. The statue is six meters tall and weighs 1.5 tons.

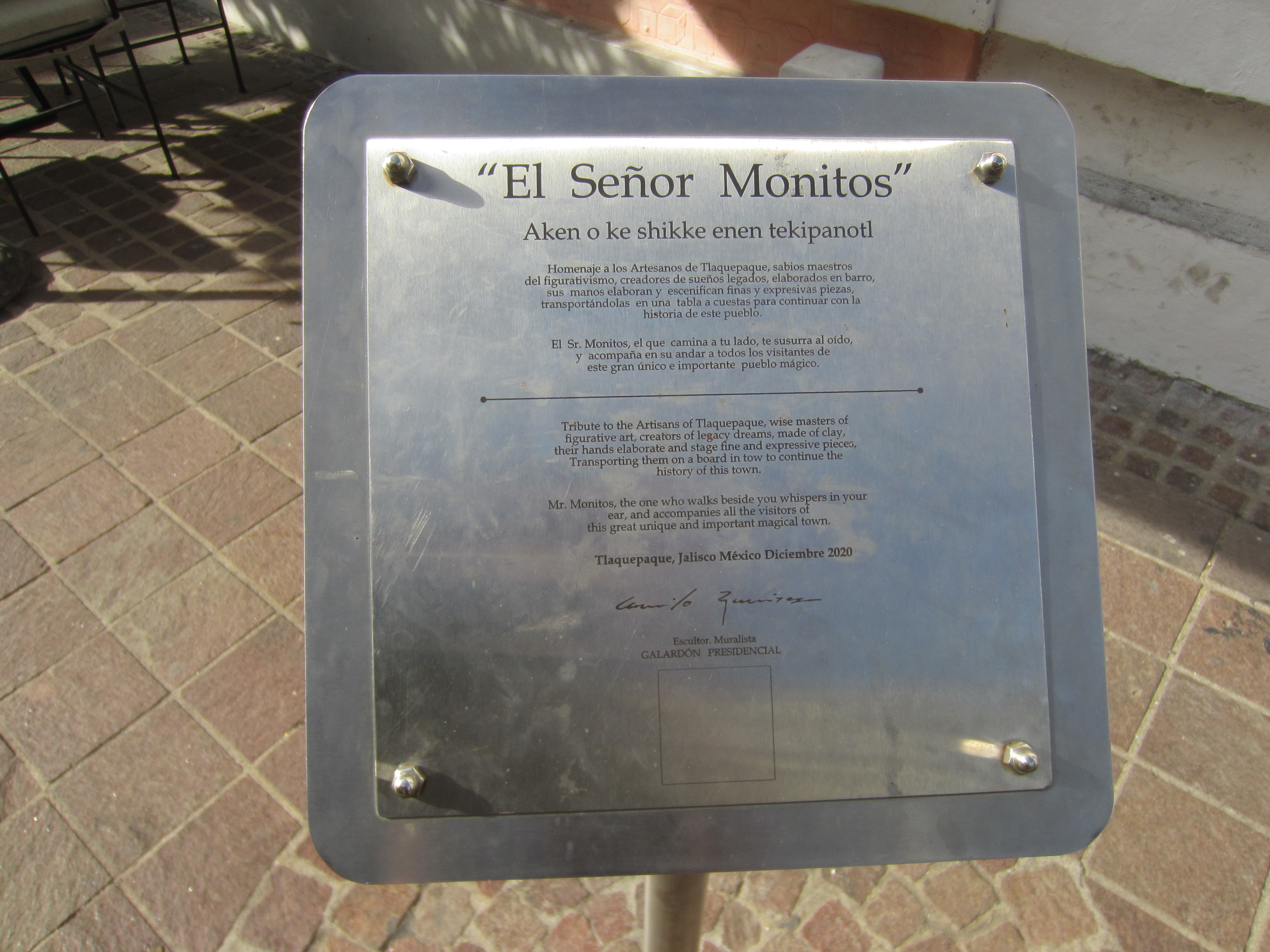
Plaque with explanation (Spanish with English translation)
