= Creo en mis raíces =

Sculpture in Tlaquepaque, Jalisco, Mexico

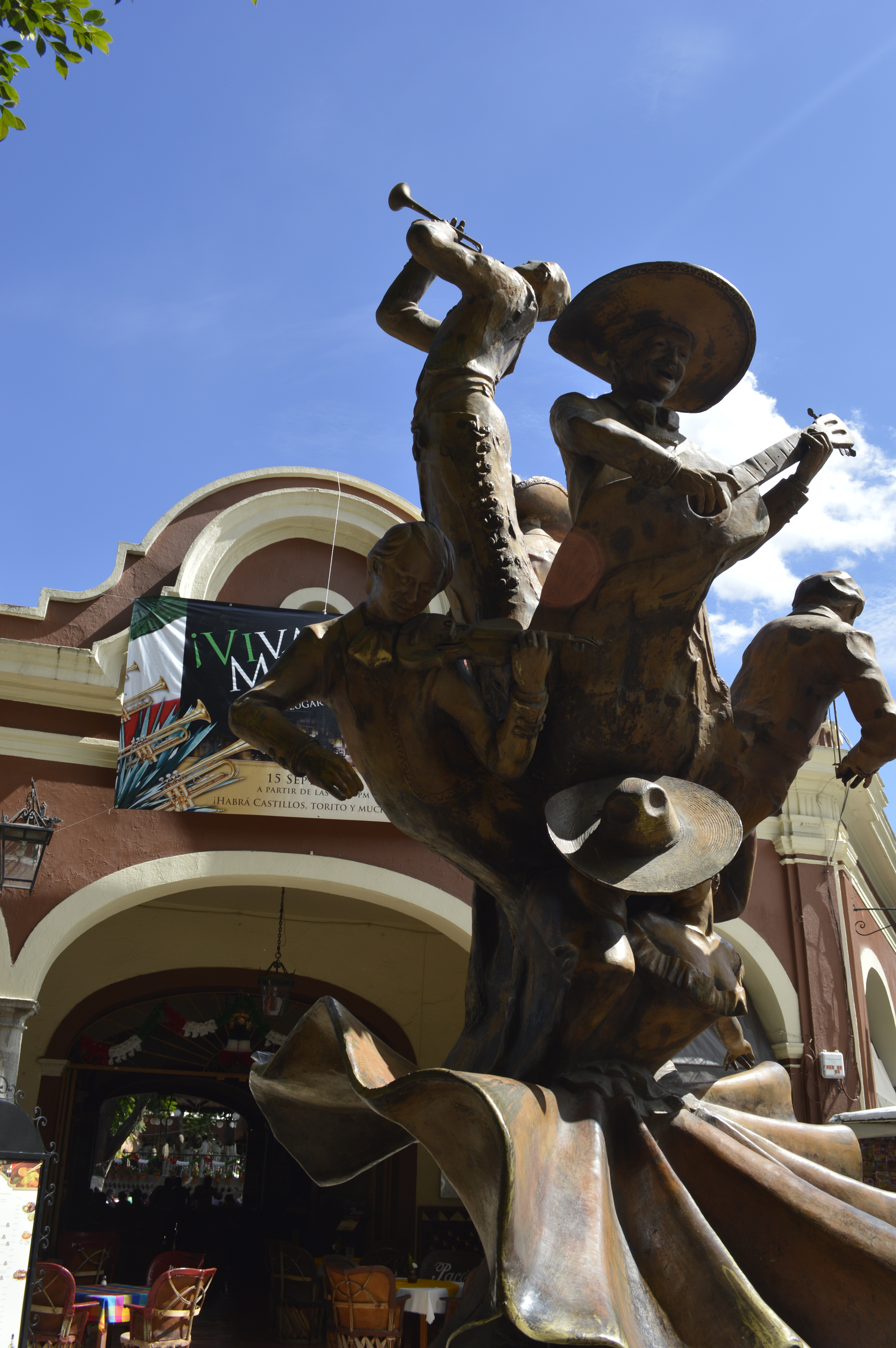
- Artist: Camilo Ramírez
- Medium: Copper
- Location: Tlaquepaque, Jalisco, Mexico
- 20°38′21″N 103°18′41″W

Creo en mis raíces (English: I believe in my roots) is a sculpture by Camilo Ramírez, installed in Tlaquepaque, in the Mexican state of Jalisco.

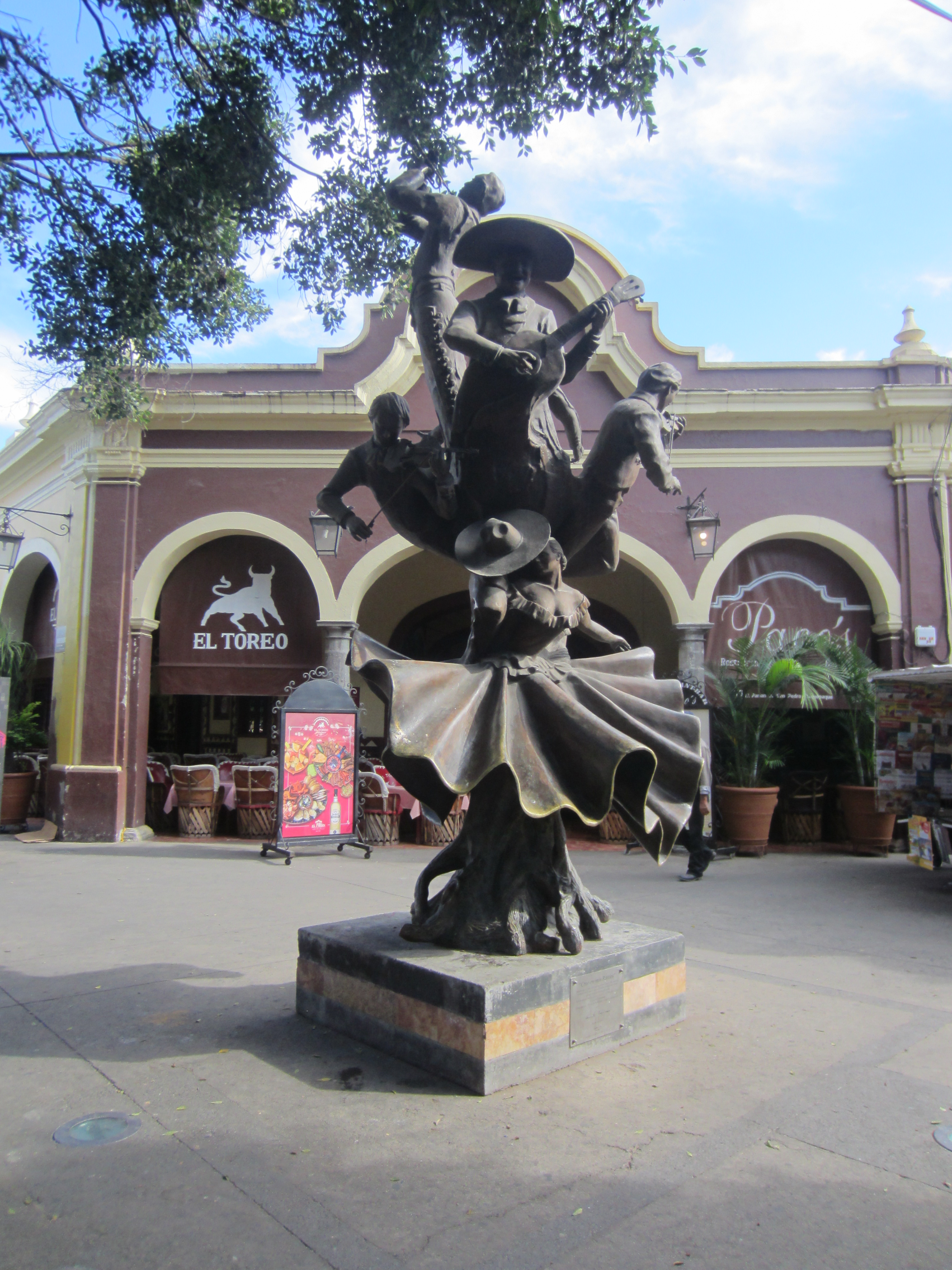

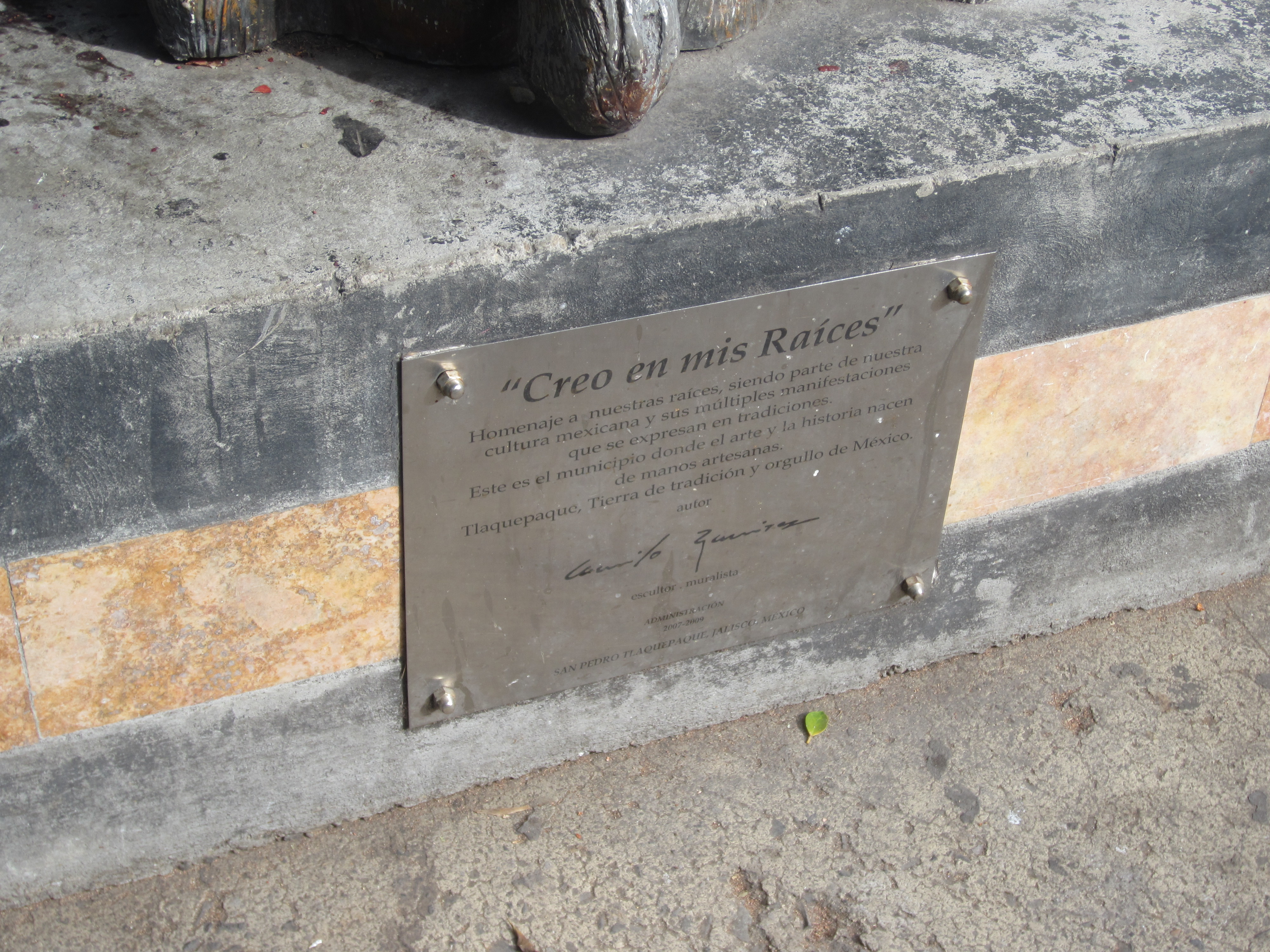
Plaque
