= Symbols of Tlaquepaque =

The symbols of the city of Tlaquepaque, Mexico, are the coat of arms or seal and the municipal flag. Other cultural symbols include the Saint Peter church and the handcraft jarritos.

== Coat of arms ==
Coat of Arms of Tlaquepaque.

The Coat of Arms of Tlaquepaque is a Spanish-shaped shield with two blue and gold fields interspersed with a helmet on the head.

In one quarter is the pottery of the Tlaquepaque artisans; the other quarter has the order of Saint Francis of Assisi; in the lower left quarter is a well, and the lower right quarter has the keys of Saint Peter with a rooster.

For exterior decoration, a green molded card with trimmings and foliage and dependencies in gold. The four quarters of the Coat of Arms of Tlaquepaque form the municipal flag of Tlaquepaque.

== Flag ==
Tlaquepaque
- Use: Civil and state flag
- Proportion: 4:7
- Adopted: 2010

The flag of Tlaquepaque was adopted in 2014. It has four horizontal quarters of blue, yellow, yellow, and blue with the coat of arms of Tlaquepaque city. It was adopted in 2010. The ratio of the flag is 4: 7.

=== Design and symbolism ===
The colors of the flag of Tlaquepaque are inspired by the flag of New Galicia. The meanings of the colors of the municipal flag are as follows:

- Gold (yellow): Do good to the poor.
- Azur (blue): Serve the rulers and promote agriculture.

== See also ==
- List of Mexican municipal flags
- Tlaquepaque
- Flag of Jalisco
