= El grito continua =

Sculpture in Tlaquepaque, Jalisco, Mexico

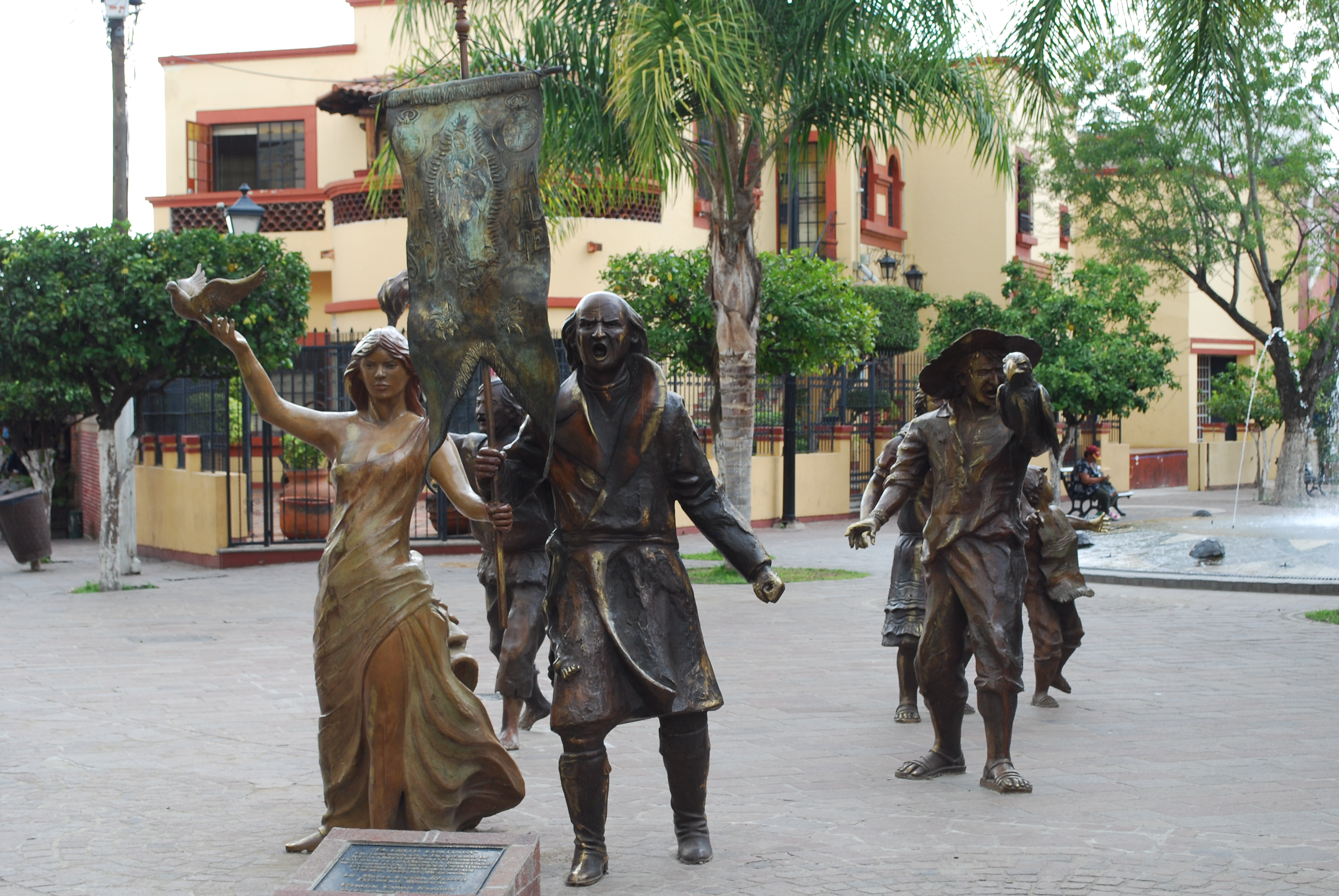
- The sculpture in 2011
- Artist: Camilo Ramírez
- Location: Tlaquepaque, Jalisco, Mexico

El grito continua is a 2010 sculpture by Camilo Ramírez, installed in Tlaquepaque, in the Mexican state of Jalisco.
