= Santuario de Nuestra Señora de la Soledad =

Church in Tlaquepaque, Jalisco, Mexico

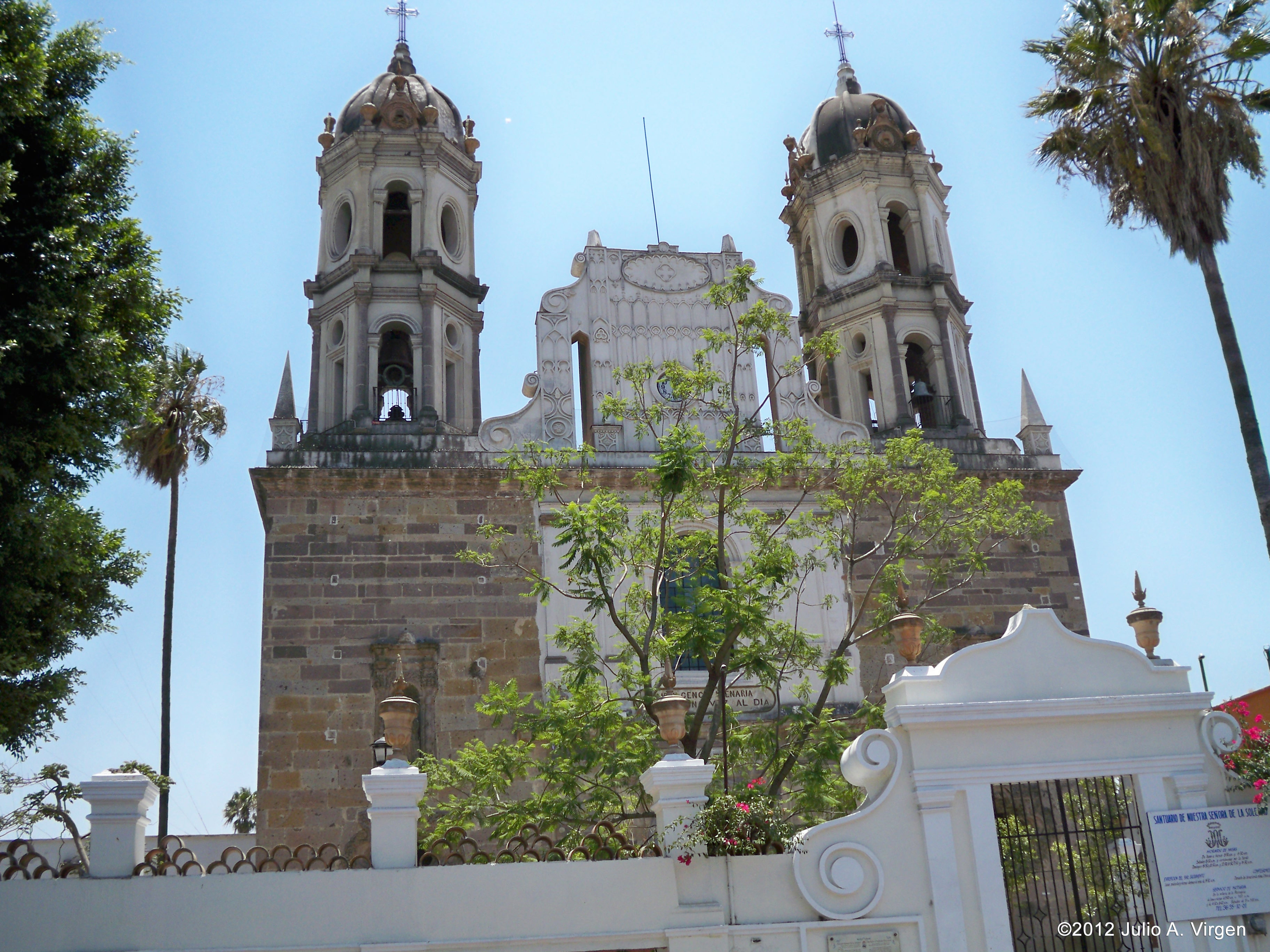
- The church in 2009

- Location within Mexico

Location
- Municipality: Tlaquepaque
- State: Jalisco
- Country: Mexico
- Interactive map of Santuario de Nuestra Señora de la Soledad
- Coordinates: 20°38′23″N 103°18′45″W

The Santuario de Nuestra Señora de la Soledad is a church in Tlaquepaque, in the Mexican state of Jalisco.
