= El Parián (Tlaquepaque) =

Coordinates: 20°38′20″N 103°18′40″W

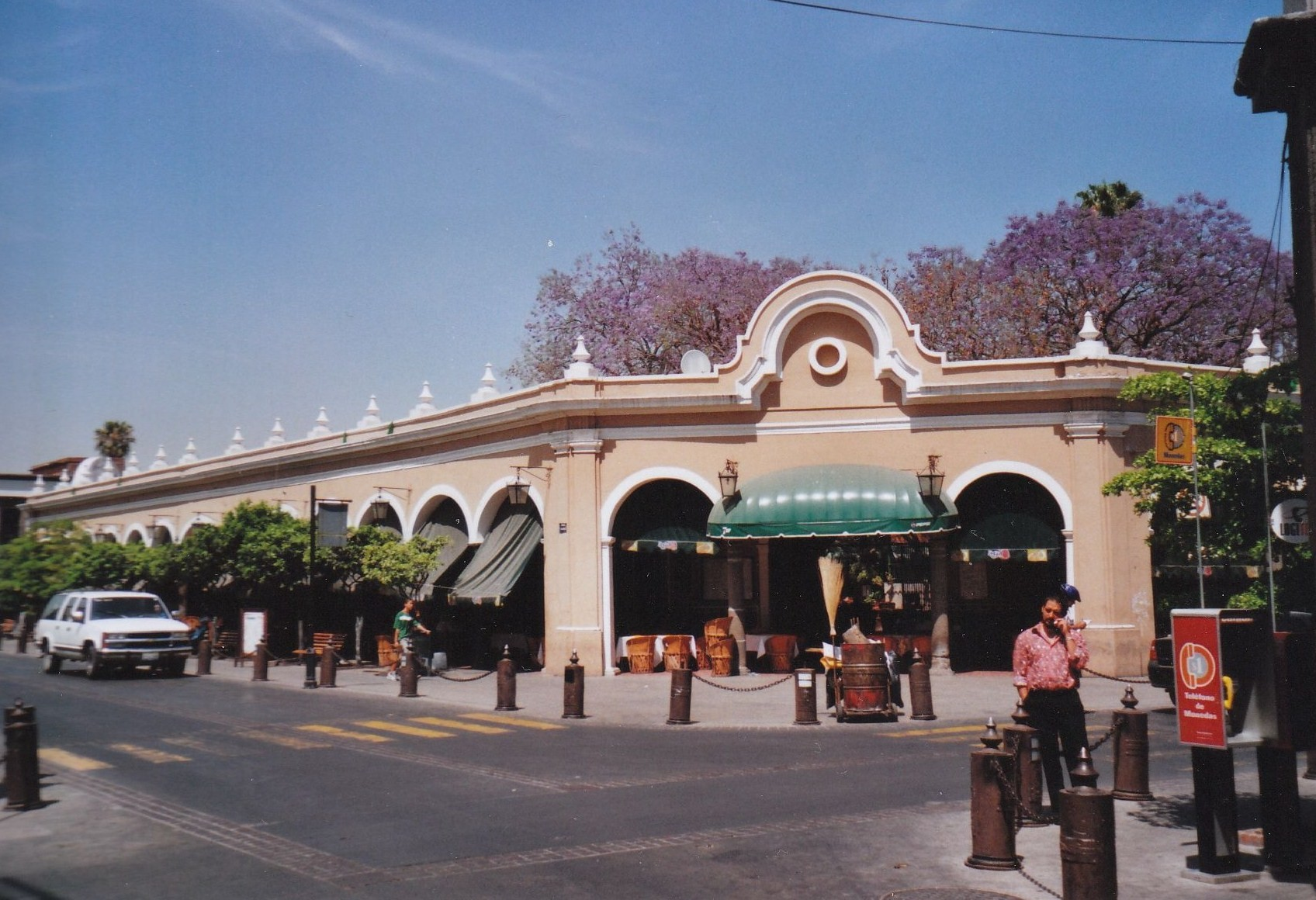
- The building in 2007
- Interactive map of the El Parián area

General information
- Location: Tlaquepaque, Mexico

El Parián is a historic structure and tourist attraction in Tlaquepaque, in the Mexican state of Jalisco. Part of El Parián collapsed on 3 September 2024.
