= Jardín Hidalgo =

Plaza in Tlaquepaque, Jalisco, Mexico

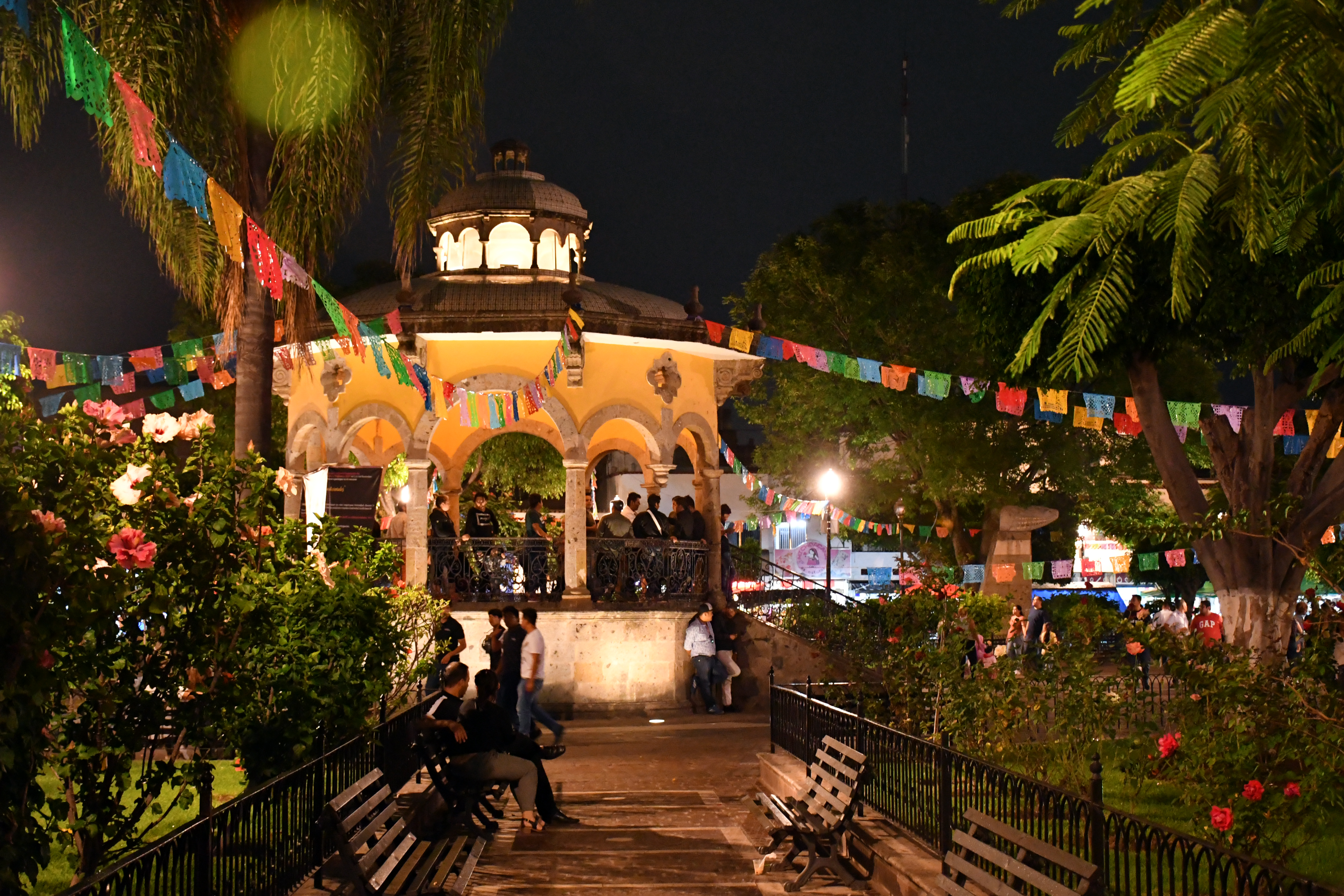
- The plaza in 2018
- Location: Tlaquepaque, Jalisco, Mexico
- Location within Mexico
- Coordinates: 20°38′23″N 103°18′43″W

Jardín Hidalgo is a plaza in Tlaquepaque, in the Mexican state of Jalisco.
