= List of Mexican municipal flags =

This is a list of municipal flags in Mexico.

== Baja California ==
Tijuana

== Chiapas ==
Tuxtla Gutiérrez

== Chihuahua ==
Chihuahua City

=== Historical ===
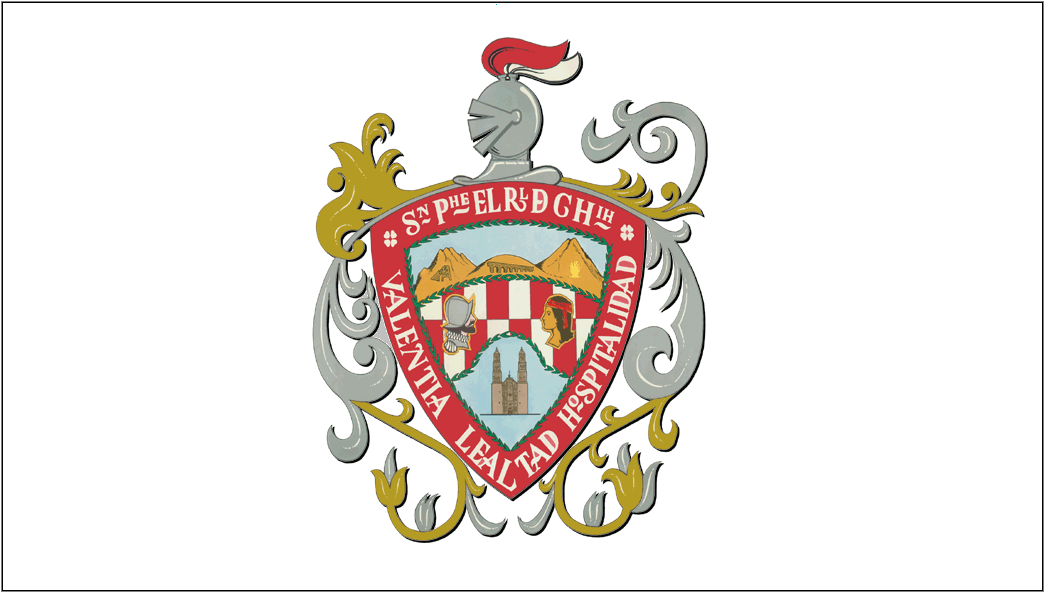
Chihuahua City (1946–2001)

Chihuahua City (2001–2006)

== Coahuila ==
Torreón

== Durango ==
Gómez Palacio
(government flag)

== Guanajuato ==
Irapuato

== Jalisco ==
Atotonilco El Alto

Autlán

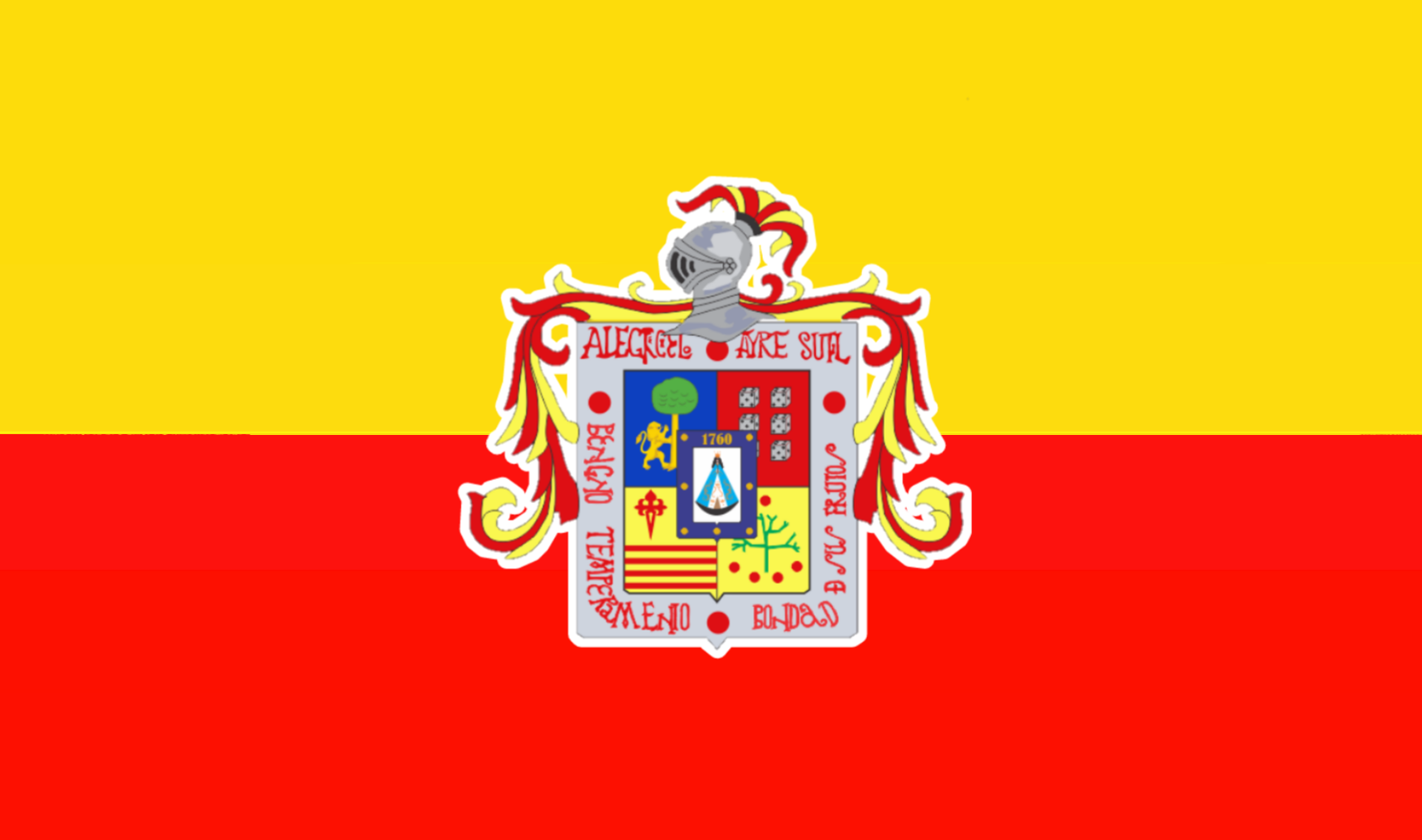
Encarnación de Díaz

Guadalajara

Ixtlahuacán de los Membrillos

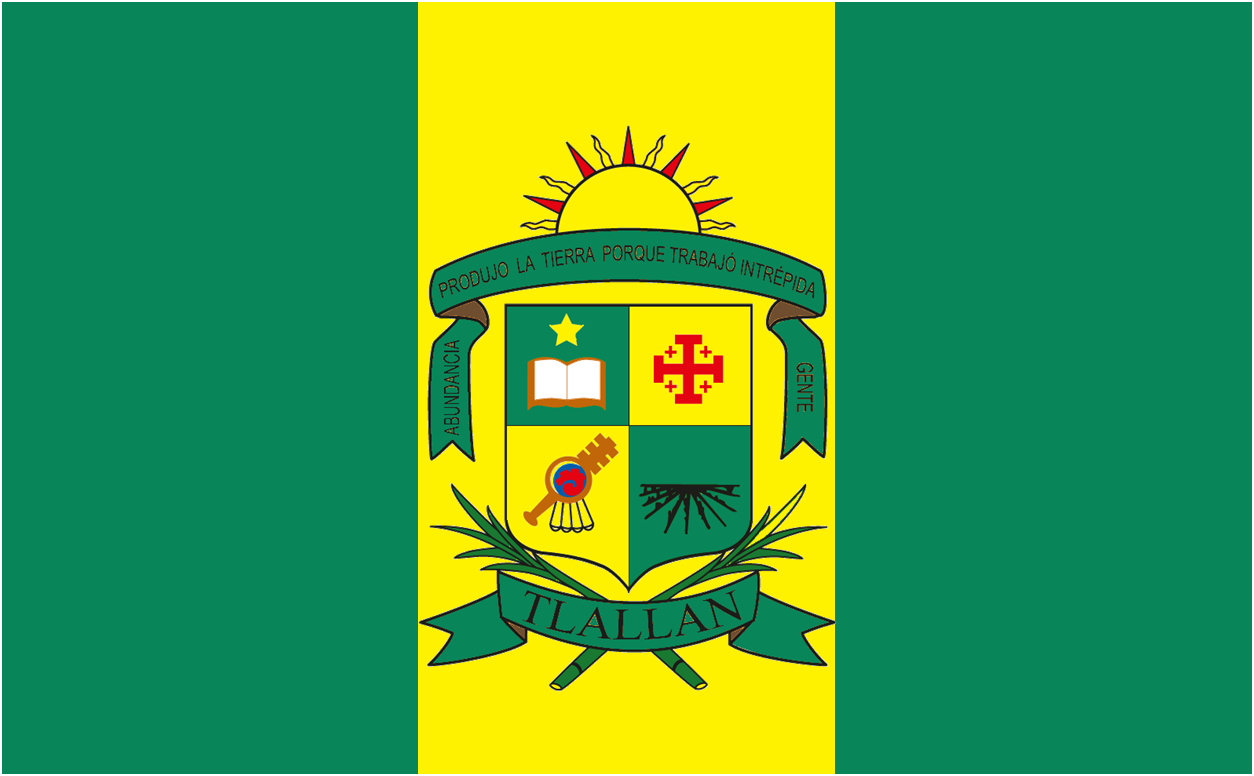
Tala

Tlaquepaque

Tonaya

=== Historical ===
Atotonilco el Alto (2018–2021)

Flag of Guadalajara (1967–2020)

== México ==
Tequixquiac

Toluca

=== Historical ===
Coacalco de Berriozábal (2009–2012)

Coacalco de Berriozábal (2019–2021)

== Michoacán ==
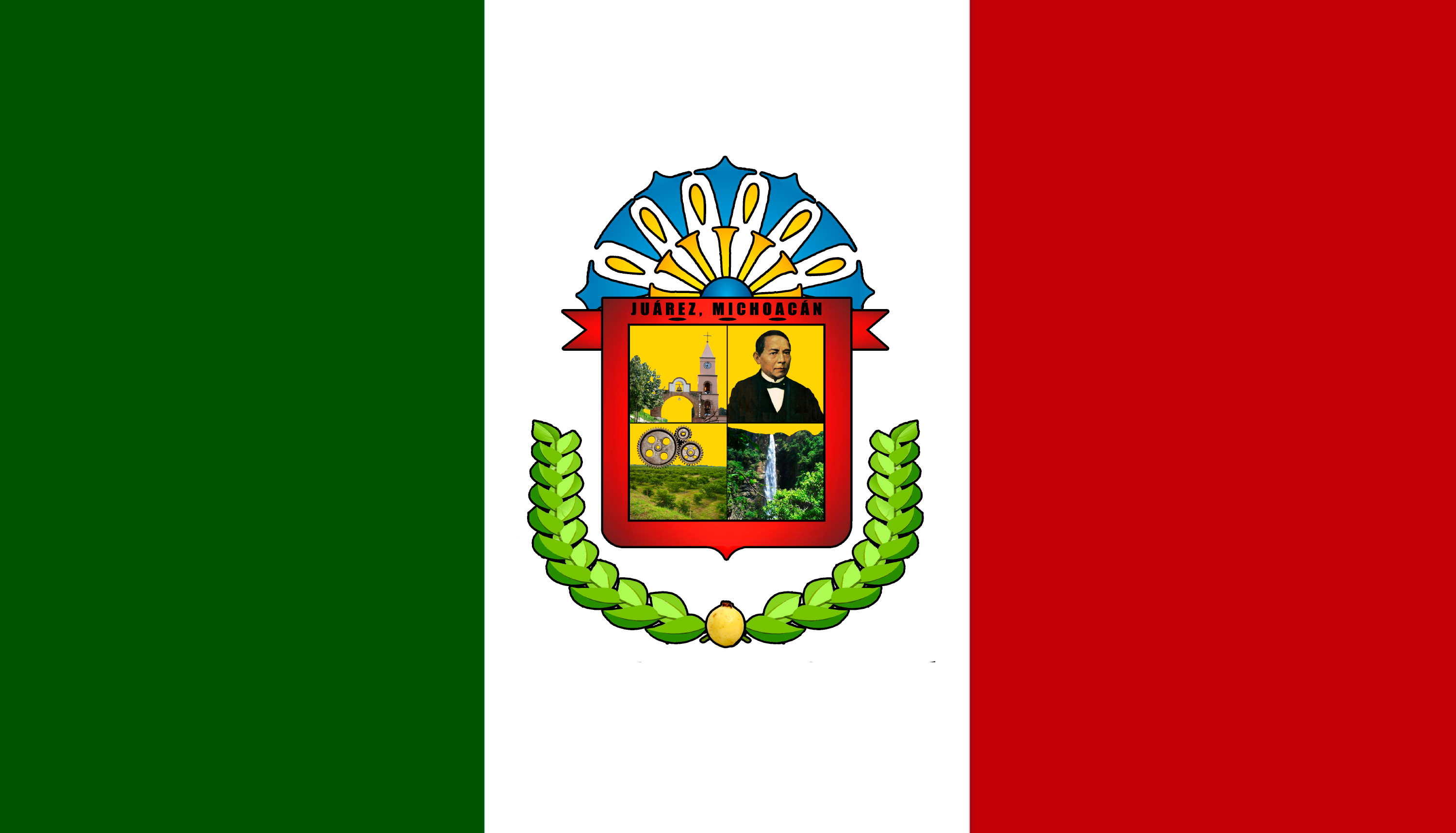
Juárez

Morelia

== Nuevo León ==
Monterrey

== Oaxaca ==
Santiago Matatlán

== Puebla ==
Puebla

== Quintana Roo ==
Benito Juárez

Cozumel

Isla Mujeres

Solidaridad

== Veracruz ==
Veracruz

== Yucatán ==
Mérida

Tekax

== Mexico City ==
Mexico City

== See also ==
- Flag of Mexico
- State flags of Mexico
- List of Mexican flags
