= Puente Artesanal =

Bridge in Tlaquepaque, Jalisco, Mexico

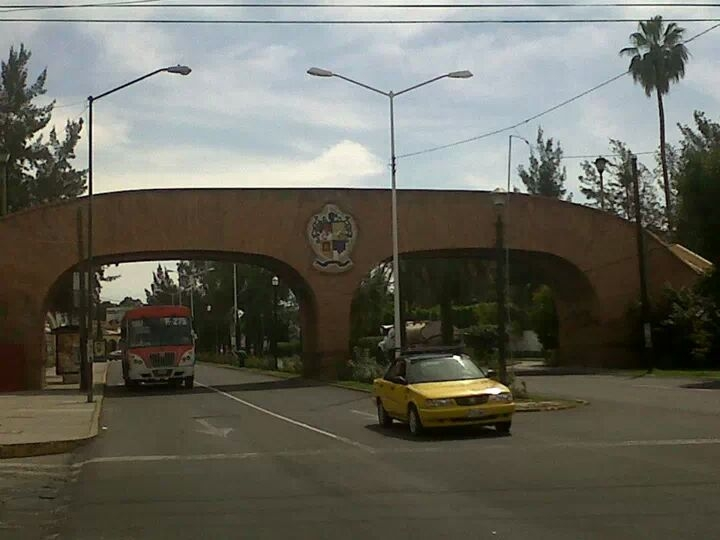
- The bridge in Tlaquepaque
- Coordinates: 20°38′29″N 103°19′02″W
- Locale: Tlaquepaque, Jalisco, Mexico

History
- Construction end: 1978

Puente Artesanal is a bridge and sign denoting the entrance to Tlaquepaque, in the Mexican state of Jalisco.

The structure was completed in 1978.
