= Parroquia de San Pedro Apostol (Zapopan) =

Church in Zapopan, Jalisco, Mexico

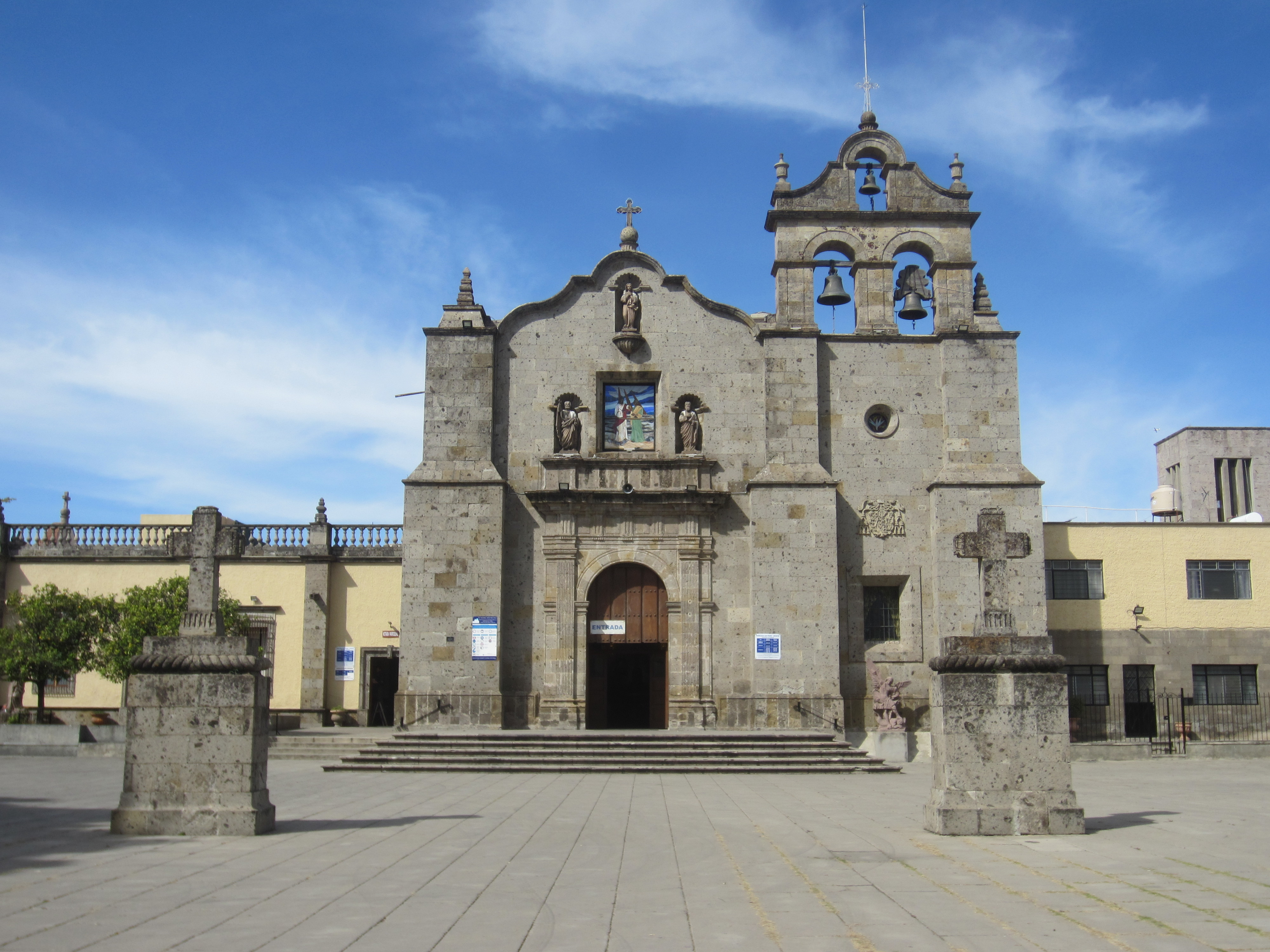
- The parish in 2021

- Location within Mexico

Location
- Municipality: Zapopan
- State: Jalisco
- Country: Mexico
- Interactive map of Parroquia de San Pedro Apostol
- Coordinates: 20.7219°N 103.3908°W

Parroquia de San Pedro Apostol is a church in Zapopan, in the Mexican state of Jalisco.
