= Coyula =

Coyula may refer to:

- Mario Coyula Cowley (1935–2014), Cuban architect and architectural historian
- Miguel Coyula (Miguel Coyula Aquino, born 1977), Cuban film director and writer, son of Mario Coyula Cowley
- Coyula, Tonalá, a place in Mexico
