= Parroquia de San Pedro Apóstol (Tlaquepaque) =

Church in Tlaquepaque, Jalisco, Mexico

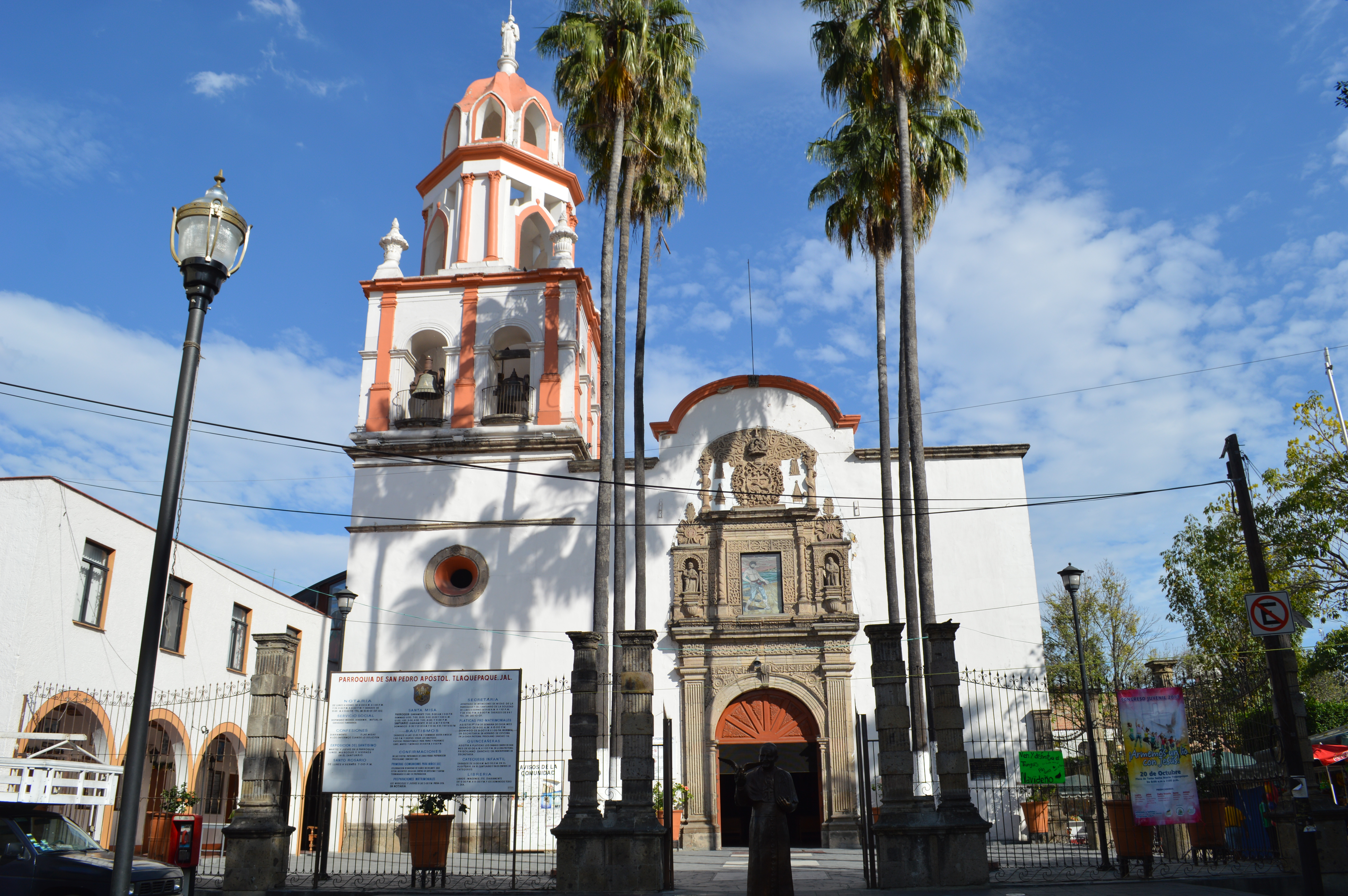
- The parish in 2013

- Location within Mexico

Location
- Municipality: Tlaquepaque
- State: Jalisco
- Country: Mexico
- Interactive map of Parroquia de San Pedro Apóstol
- Coordinates: 20°38′25″N 103°18′43″W

Parroquia de San Pedro Apóstol is a church in Tlaquepaque, in the Mexican state of Jalisco.
