= Tlaquepaque =

- City
- San Pedro Tlaquepaque
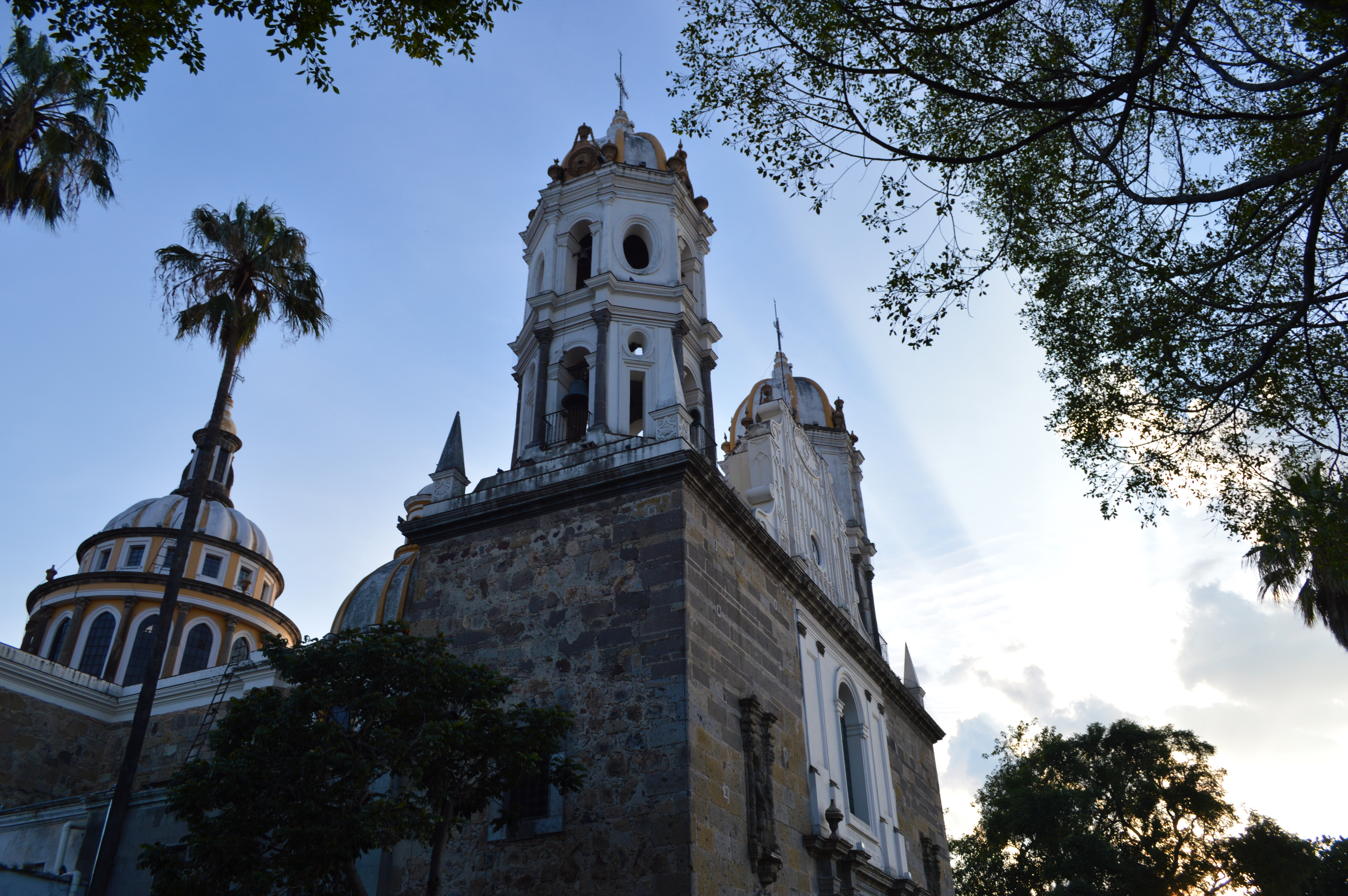
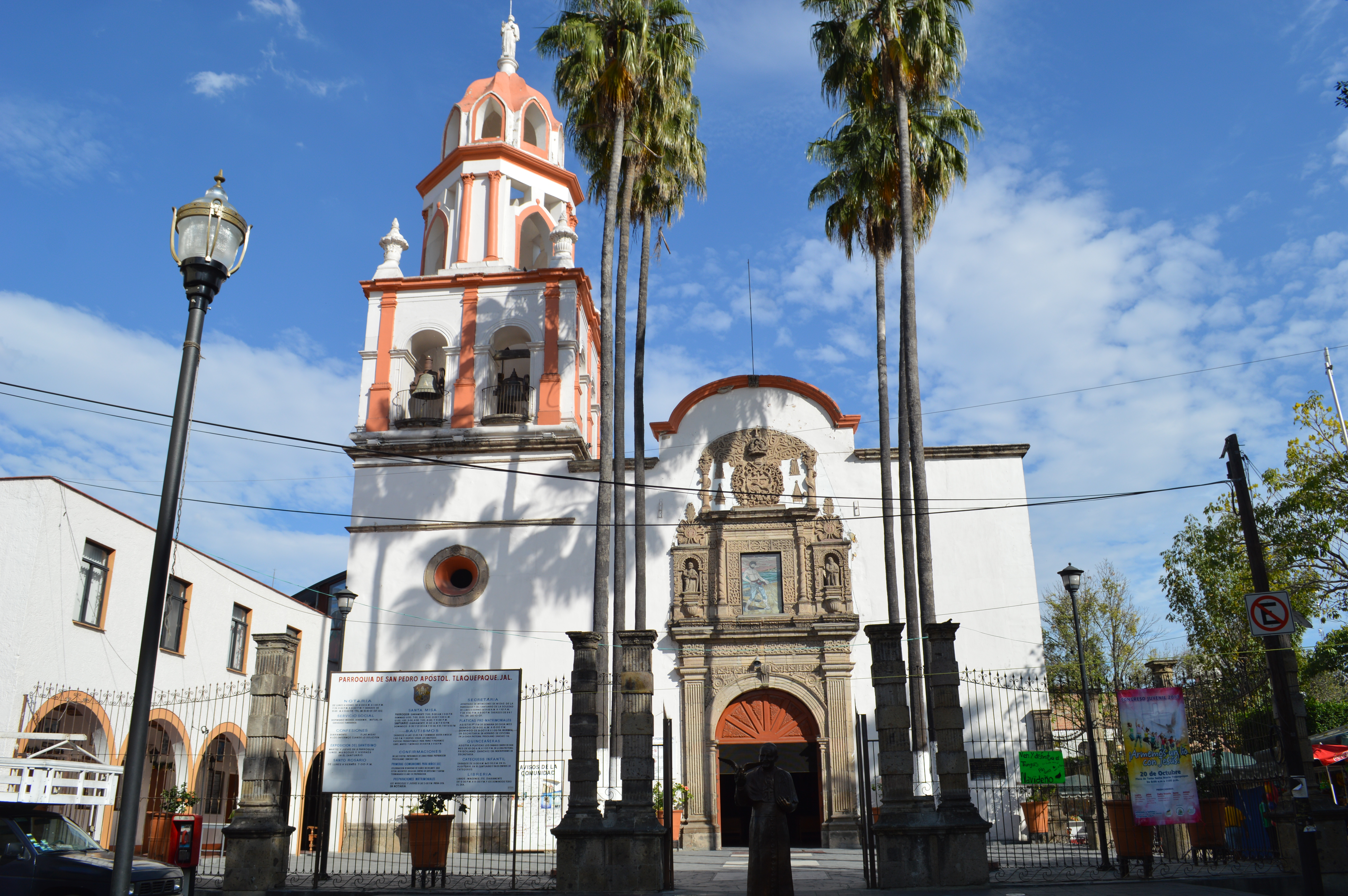
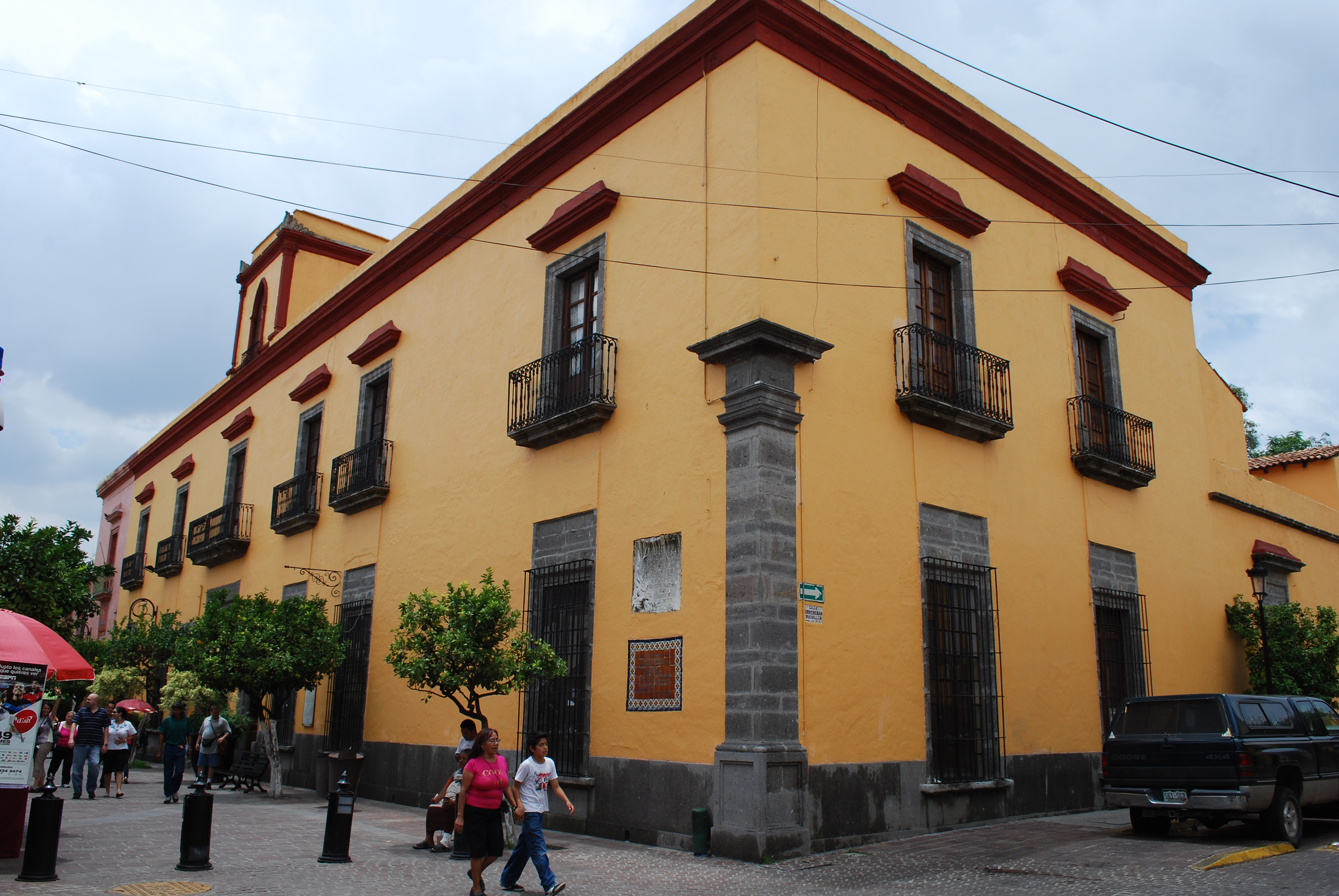
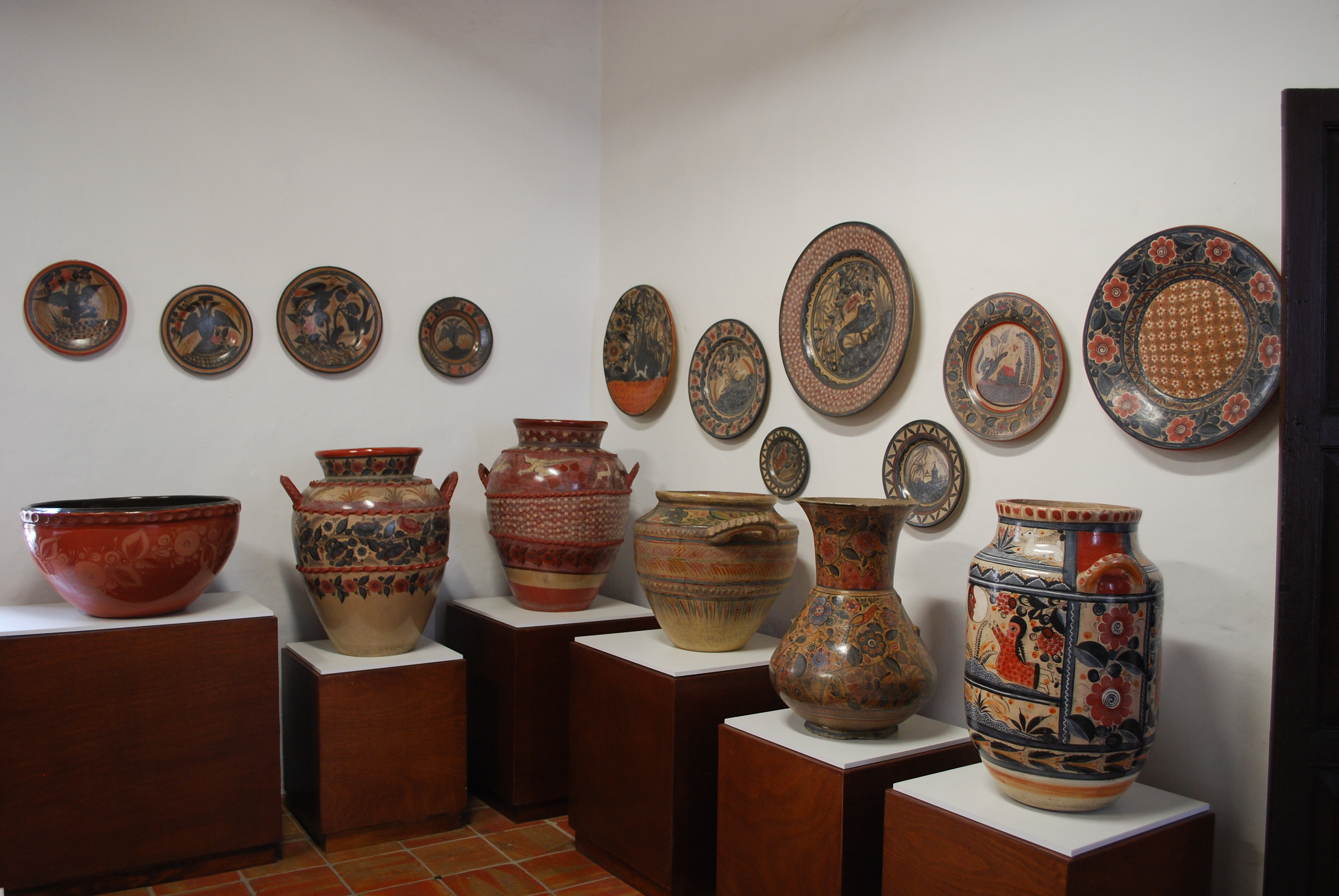
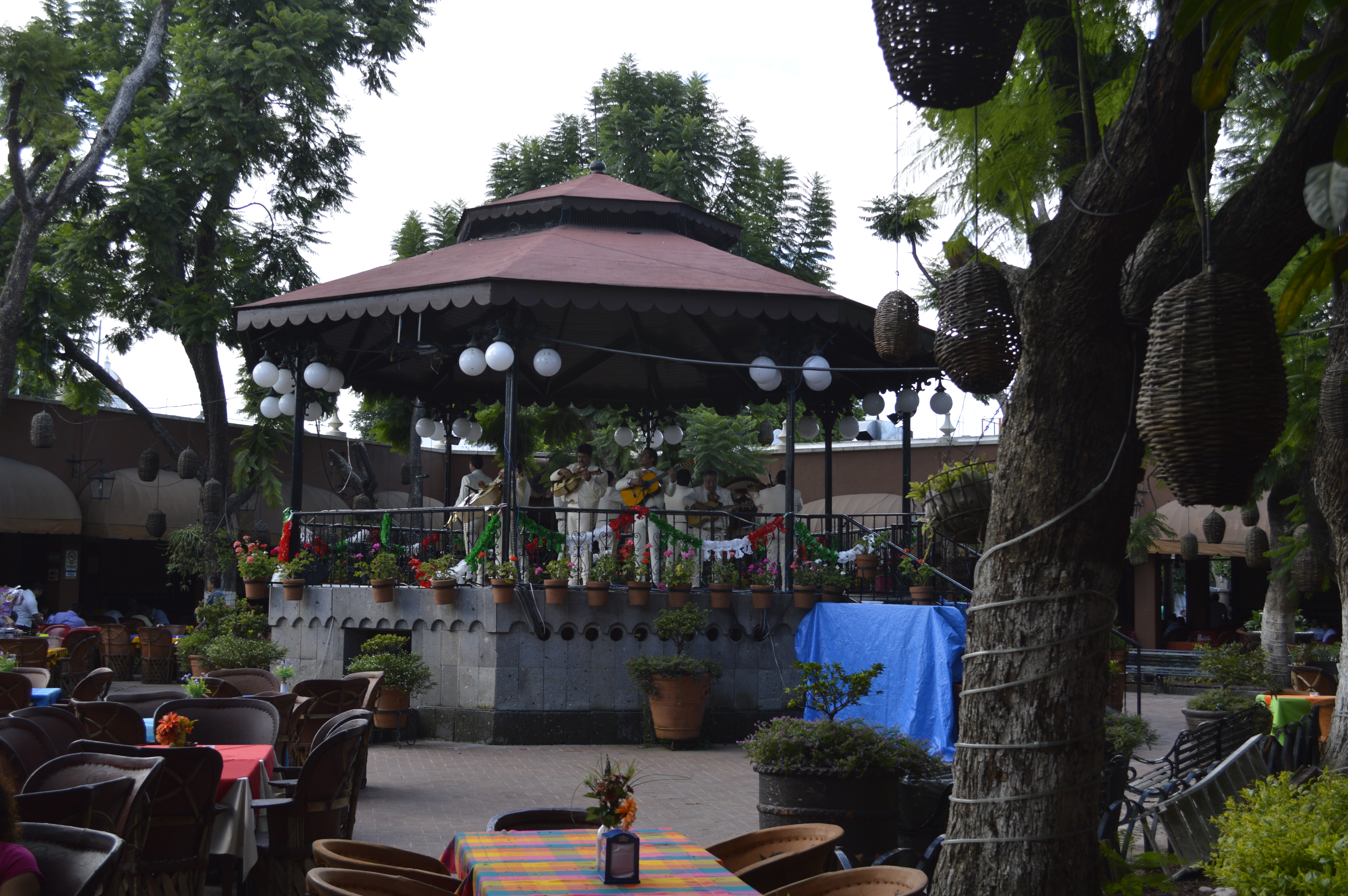
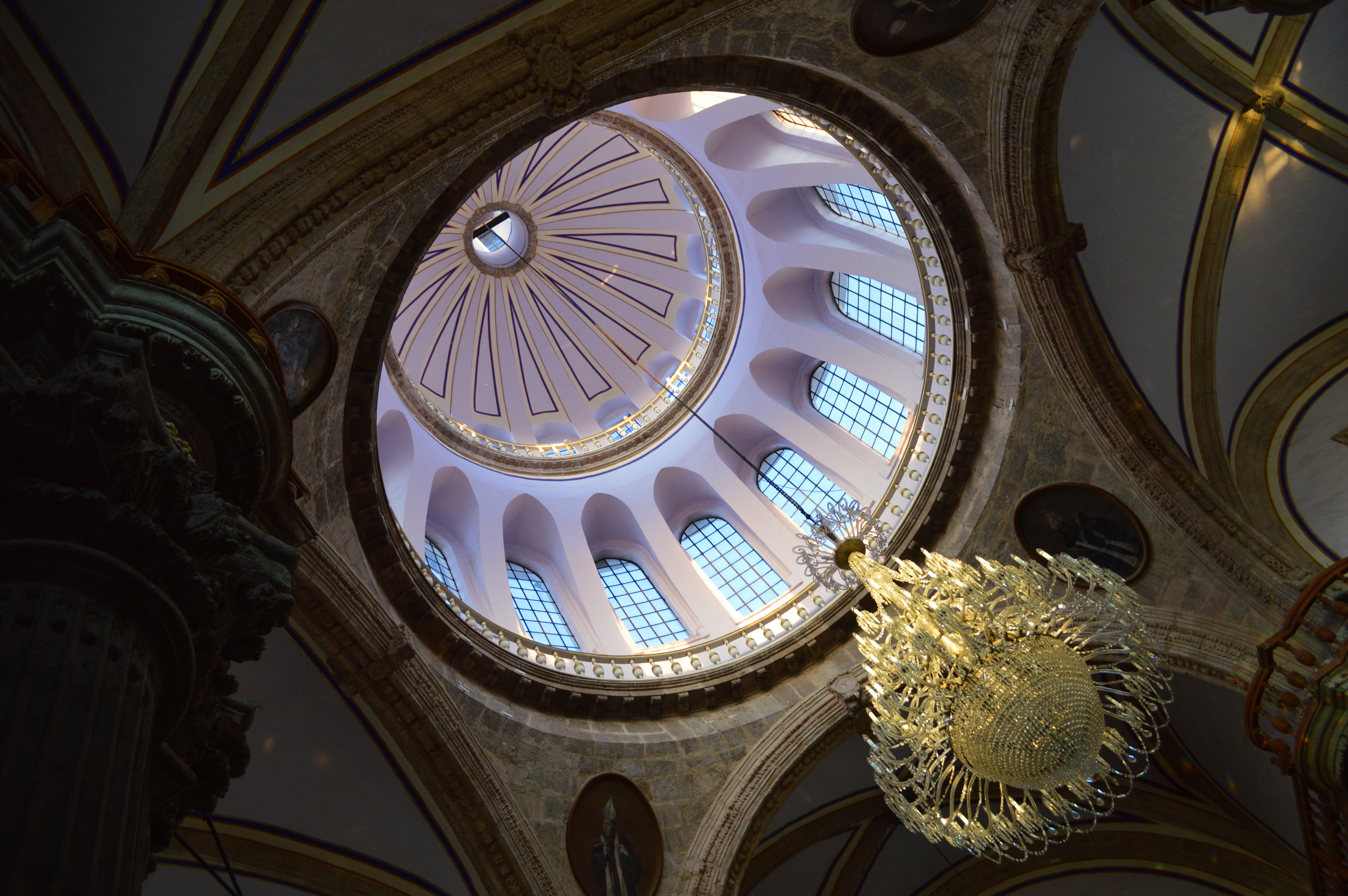
- Sanctuary of La Soledad, San Pedro Parish, Historical House, Regional Ceramic Museum, El Parian and the interior of the Sanctuary of La Soledad

- Flag Coat of arms
- Nickname: Spanish: La villa alfarera (English: Potter's village)
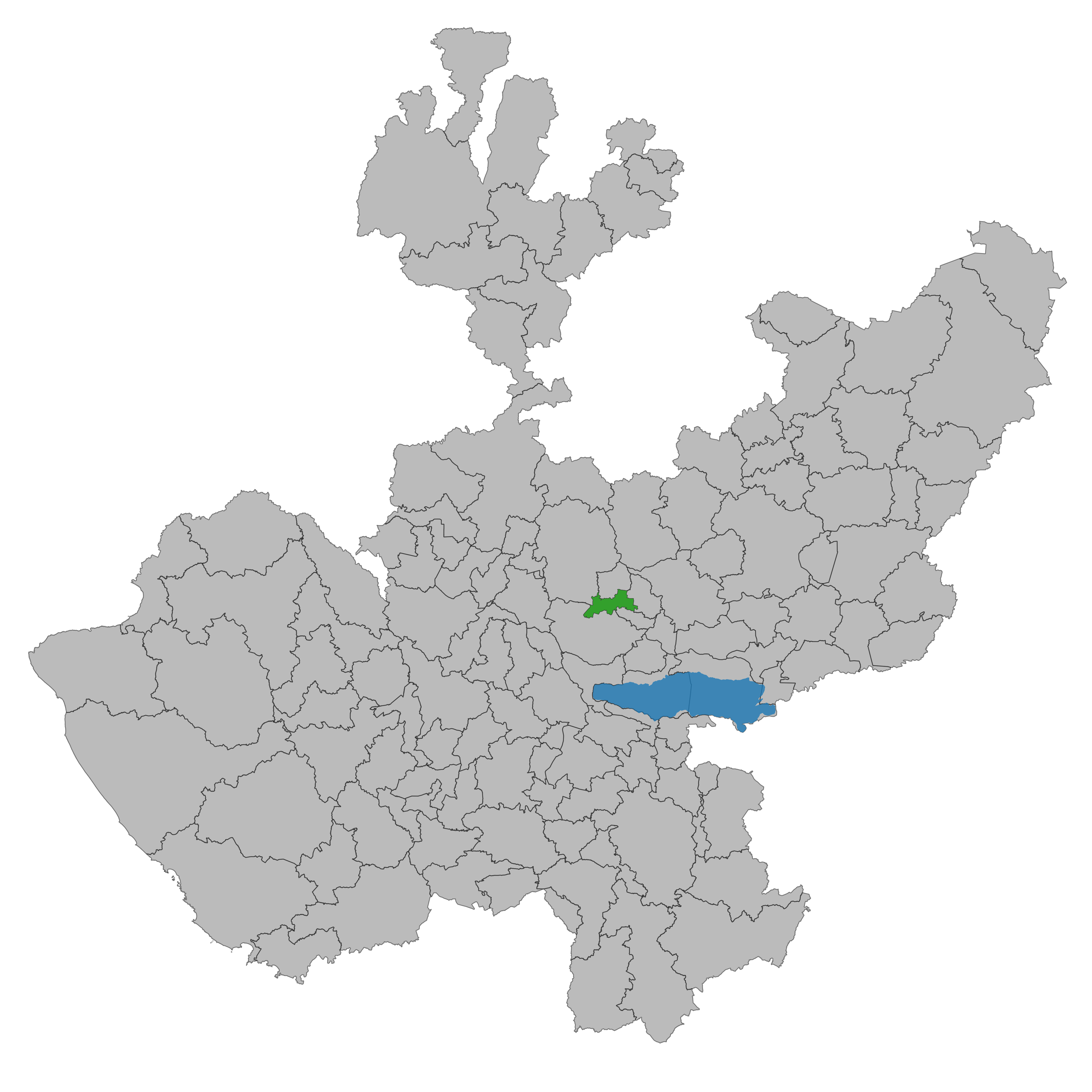

- Location within Mexico
- Coordinates: 20°37′N 103°19′W
- Country: Mexico
- State: Jalisco
- Region: Centro
- Municipality: Tlaquepaque
- Foundation: 25 March 1530

Government
  - Municipal president: Mirna Citlalli Amaya de Luna (Citizens' Movement)

Area
  - City: 82.04 km^{2} (31.68 sq mi)
  - Metro: 3,571 km^{2} (1,379 sq mi)
  - Municipality: 116.8 km^{2} (45.1 sq mi)
- Elevation: 1,870 m (6,140 ft)

Population (2020 census)
  - City: 650,123
  - Density: 7,924/km^{2} (20,520/sq mi)
  - Metro: 5,268,642
  - Metro density: 1,475/km^{2} (3,821/sq mi)
  - Municipality: 687,127
  - Municipality density: 5,883/km^{2} (15,240/sq mi)
- Demonym: Tlaquepaquense
- Time zone: UTC−6 (CST)
- Website: https://www.tlaquepaque.gob.mx/

Tlaquepaque (Spanish pronunciation: [tlakeˈpake]), officially San Pedro Tlaquepaque, is a city and the surrounding municipality in the Mexican state of Jalisco.

== Geography ==
During the 20th century, it was absorbed by the outward spread of the state capital, and is now a fully integrated part of the Guadalajara conurbation, lying only a few kilometers from the city center. The city had a 2010 census population of 575,942, making it the third largest city in the state, behind only Guadalajara proper, and Zapopan, another city in the metro area. The municipality's area is 270.88 km^{2} (104.59 sq mi) and lies adjacent to the south side of Guadalajara. Its largest community besides Tlaquepaque is the town of Santa Anita, at the municipality's southwestern corner.

=== Climate ===
The climate of the municipality is semi-dry with dry winter and spring, semi-warm without defined winter season. The average annual temperature is 20.7 °C (69.3 °F), and has an average annual rainfall of 919 millimetres (36.2 in) with a rain regime in the months of June to August. The prevailing winds are in a southeasterly direction. The average number of frost days per year is 5.2.

=== Natural Resources ===
It currently has a few forest areas where species of acacia, palo dulce and granjeno predominate. The native fauna is composed of rabbits, hares, squirrels, reptiles, and various bird species in the region.

=== Hydrography ===
The municipality has no river, has streams with the most outstanding being La Pila Seca, Sebastianito and New Spain. Previously there were the dams Las Lomas, La Ladrillera, Las Pintas and Las Rusias. Most of the land has an urban use and is held as private property.

=== Geology ===
Lithologically, the municipality was formed in the Quaternary period and is composed of pumitic tobas (commonly known as pumice stone that are made up of explosion products such as lapillis, puzzolanas and ash. The predominant soils belong to the type haplic feozem and planosol eútric. An associated soil is the planepeloic sun.

=== Economy ===
In the agricultural field the crops of maize, sorghum, sweet potato, onion, kale, lettuce and betabel stand out. In livestock, there are farms where meat and milk are reared, porcino-porcino cattle, sheep-sheep, goat-goat, poultry and posture, and beekeeping-beehives.

The main industrial branch is manufacturing, handicrafts, papier-mache, glass, brass, pottery, yarn, mud, leather and wood. Within the municipality are located several industrial parks, in which they house different national and transnational plants, such as:

- HP (printers and computers)
- Bimbo (breadmakers)
- Lala (milk and dairy products)
- José Cuervo (tequila)

== History ==
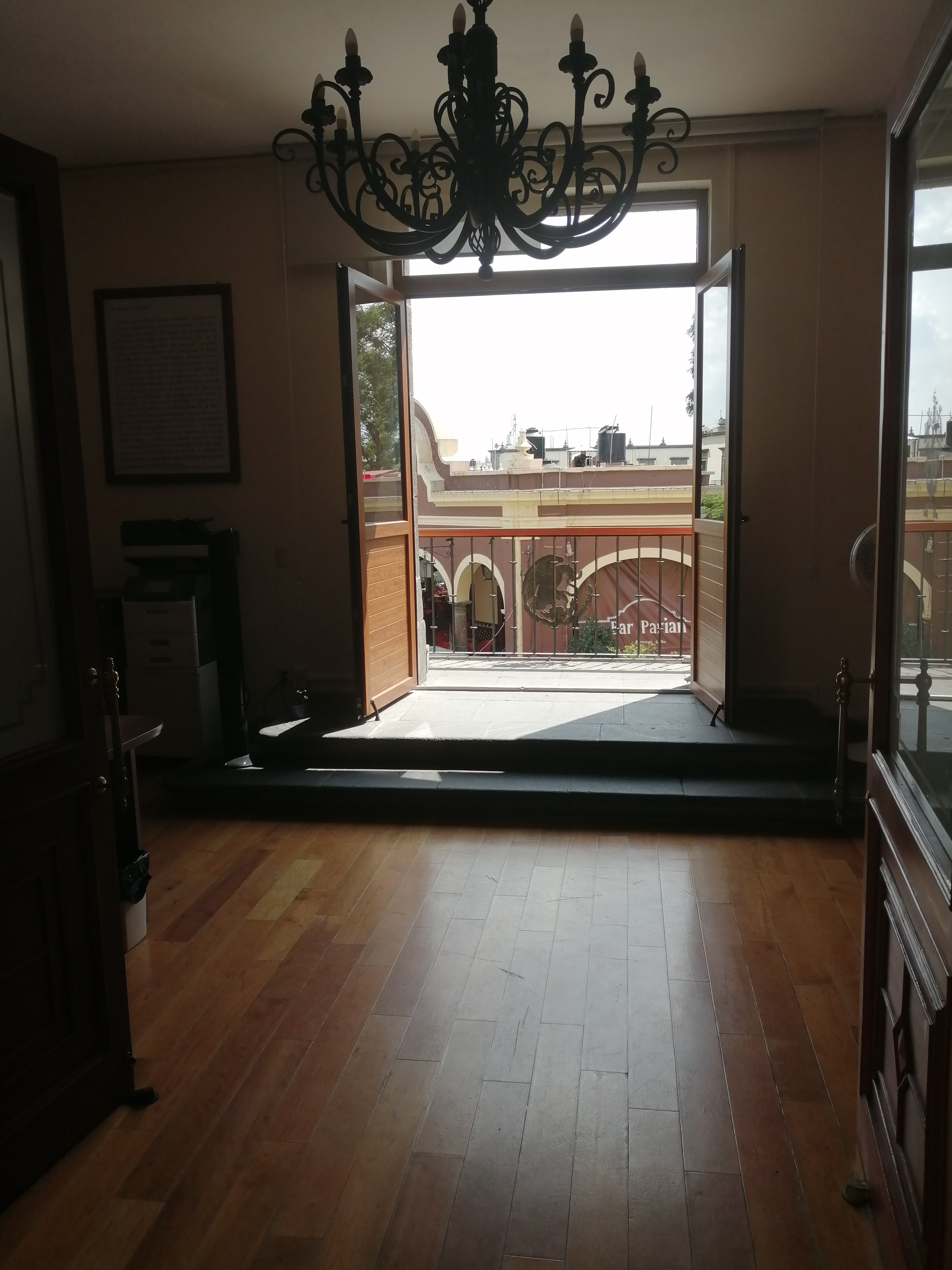
Municipal presidential balcony

The name Tlaquepaque derives from Nahuatl and means "place above clay land". The area is famous for its pottery and blown glass. Before the Spaniards arrived on these lands, the Toluquilla, Zalatitán, Coyula, Tateposco, Tlaquepaque, Tapechi (Tepetitlán), and Tequepexpan, formed with Tonalá a kingdom, ruled by a woman named Cihualpilli Tzapotzinco. It was inhabited by Tonalteca Indians and later by the tecos that were in place at the arrival of the Spaniards. It was a pre-Hispanic town settled on a hill where they built houses of grass, reaching 500 inhabitants.

In March 1530, Nuño de Guzmán and his followers arrived in the region, entering San Martín de las Flores, formerly known as Tlaxicoltzingo. Upon learning of the Spaniards' approach, the indigenous population divided into two factions. Queen Cihualpilli and some nobles advocated for a peaceful reception, acknowledging the Spaniards' superior power, while others prepared to resist. The proponents of peace sent a delegation of nobles and leaders from various towns to meet Guzmán.

Representatives included Coyotl, Chitacotl, Tonatl, Xonatic, Cuauhuntin, and Oceotl from Tlaquepaque; Coyopitzantli from Tetlán; Timoac and Oxatl from Tzalatitán; Ipac from Atemaxac; and Tzacamitl from Ichcatlán. The delegation presented Guzmán with gifts such as chickens, eggs, honey, avocados, onions, and fruits, expressing their willingness to welcome the Spaniards peacefully.

Guzmán was warmly received by Queen Cihualpilli of Tonalá, who was baptized with the name Juana Bautista Danza. The name "Danza" was chosen in a raffle that included alternatives like Petra and Micaela, commemorating a dance she organized in honor of the Spaniards.

Before entering the city, Guzmán sent men to demand submission from the resisting factions, but they were met with shouting and a rain of arrows. The resistance, led by Tlaquitehuitli of Tetlán and indigenous nobles Cuautipizahuac and Catipamatac, clashed with Guzmán's forces. The confrontation ended unfavorably for the indigenous rebels.

On 25 March 1530, Nuño de Guzmán formally claimed the kingdom of Tonalá and its subject towns, including Tlaquepaque. In 1548, the town was renamed San Pedro Tlaquepaque at the suggestion of Fray Antonio de Segovia. During the colonial era and throughout the 19th century, the town was primarily known by this name.

By the second half of the 16th century, San Pedro became part of the corregimiento under the jurisdiction of Guadalajara. As the Spaniards established control in Guadalajara, they extended political and religious authority over surrounding towns. San Pedro was required to pay tribute based on its population and economic activities.

In 1551, census records showed that San Pedro had 1,416 inhabitants living in 177 jacales (huts). The imposed tribute included four loads of grass daily, ten Castilian chickens, ten loads of firewood, five laborers per week, thirty blankets, forty Tapatío cloaks, twenty pairs of quills, six loaves of salt, and two jugs of honey every two months, as well as 400 fanegas of corn and 20 fanegas of chili annually.

By 1600, San Pedro had fewer inhabitants than Toluquilla, a community now part of Tlaquepaque. Alonso de la Mota and Escobar remarked:

Leaving, then, from Guadalajara on the road that falls further to the east, one goes to the town of San Pedro of one hundred Indian neighbors

By 1621, San Pedro was a doctrine of Franciscan religious from the convent of Guadalajara. On the morning of 26 November 1810, Hidalgo made his entrance to San Pedro where he was presented with a feast, and in the afternoon he entered the capital triumphantly.

The priest Miguel Hidalgo y Costilla arrives in San Pedro Tlaquepaque, on Sunday, 25 November, from Atequiza Jalisco. It was arranged to take for your best comfort, the most comfortable house, you will be served a great banquet at noon, and at night a refreshment with all visitors, from the church and the government. Making preparations to leave San Pedro Tlaquepaque towards the capital today Guadalajara with around 7,000 men. Arriving around noon at the gates of the cathedral. In 1821, San Pedro Tlaquepaque was the cradle of the proclamation of the 'Independence of Jalisco' by the brigadier Pedro Celestino Negrete, since the document is signed in the town on 13 June of the same year. According to the decree of 27 March 1824, San Pedro became a member of the Guadalajara Department. In 1825, San Pedro is registered as a town.

== Cultural Center El Refugio ==
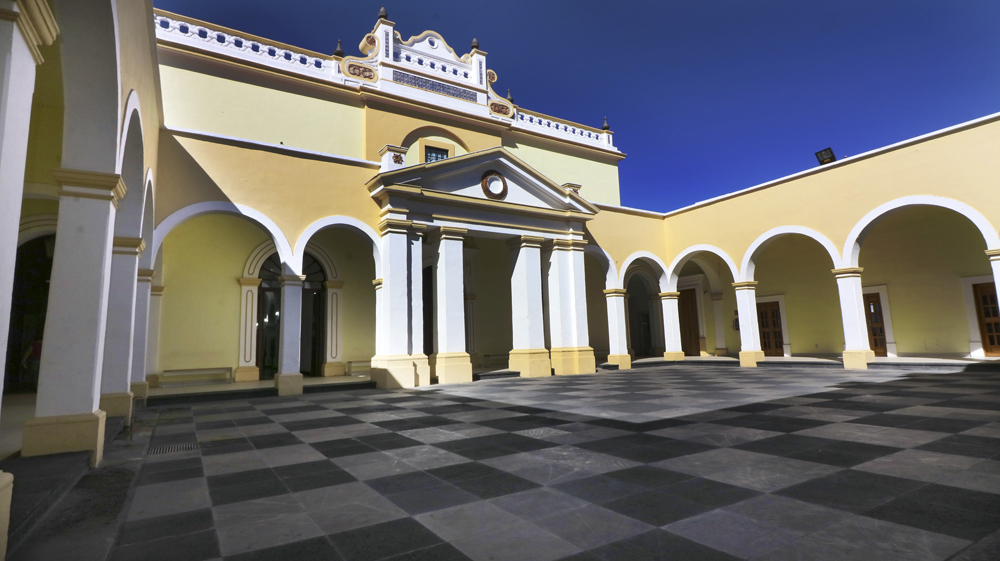
Museo Premio Nacional de Ceramica, Pantaleón Panduro

In 1859, Fray Luis Argüello Bernal was given the task of designing, sponsoring and building a hospital and house of spiritual exercises that was named "El Refugio" and "Casa de la Salud Josefina", (since it was administered by the Religious Josefinas until 1935), this with the financing of the Brotherhood of San Vicente de Paul, in addition to the contributions of the neighborhood of San Pedro, as well as the wealthy families of Guadalajara who had their summer homes in San Pedro Tlaquepaque. Its construction is colonial style of approximately 10,000 m^{2}.

In the year of 1979 it was closed, and after being abandoned for a long time, the construction was acquired by the Municipal Administration of Tlaquepaque of Mr. Porfirio Cortés Silva in 1983; and rescued, renovated and modified in 1984 by the architect Alejandro Zhon, in order to carry out the Cultural Center "The Refuge" who was responsible for carrying out the rehabilitation work, which retained the original architecture of the building, highlighting its lengths corridors and large patios, making it a Cultural, Commercial, Craft and Tourist Center.

== Tourism ==
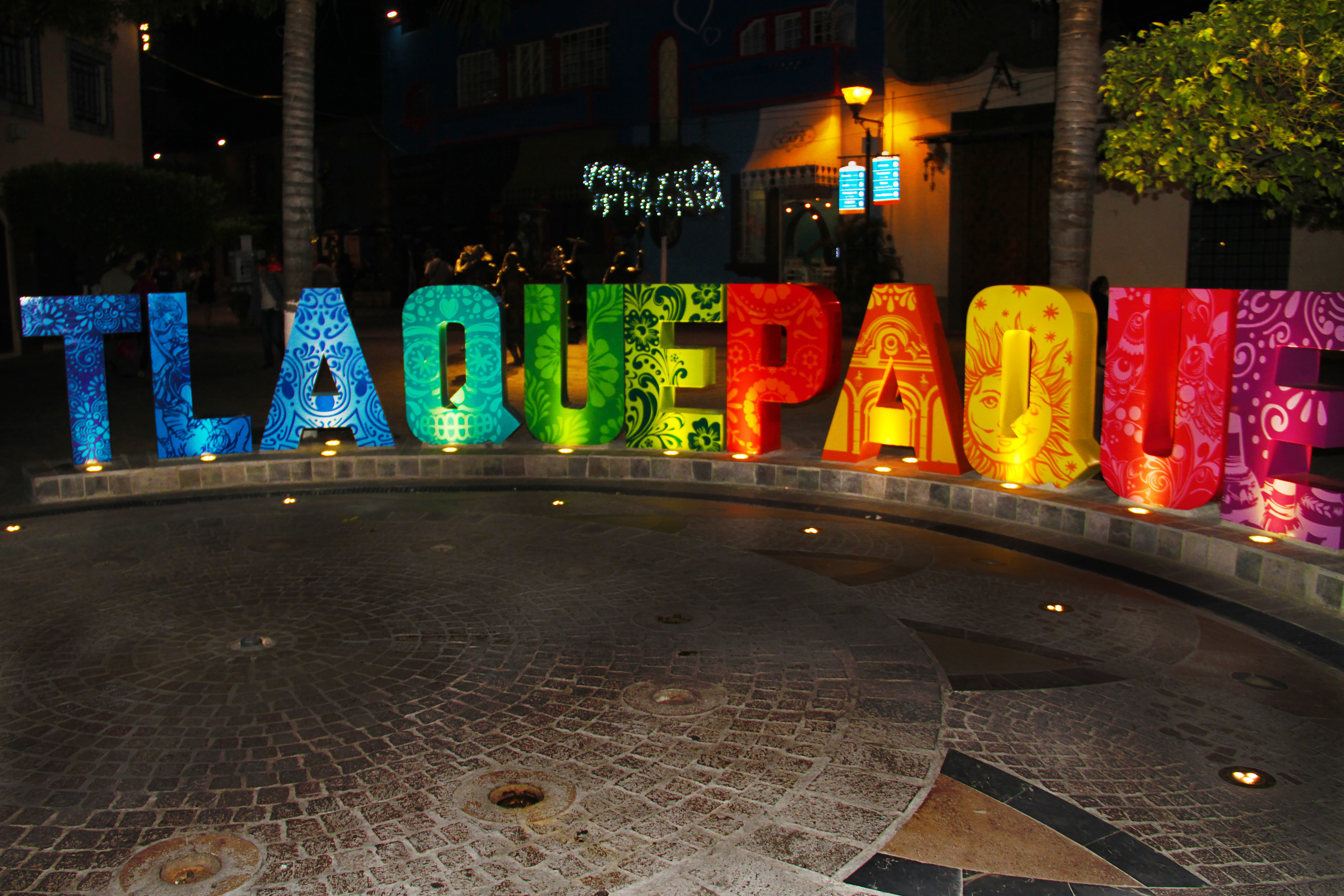
Giant Tlaquepaque Letters

The city was designated "Pueblo Mágico" in 2018. It is a resort focused on the crafts of pottery, textiles and [blowing glass]. Its streets and walkers are adorned with various Casonas of the last century, in addition to colonial constructions, the Tapatío Tour arrives at the municipality on one of its routes. Main attractions include:

- St. Peter's Parish – enclosure built by the Franciscan Order, which receives the category of Parish in 1845, constitutes one of the spiritual pillars of San Pedro Tlaquepaque. Its construction is a mixture of styles, including: Byzantine, Baroque and Roman. At the front is the terminus of St. John Paul II.
- Jardín Hidalgo – with its square and kiosk surrounded by fresh palms, ash and roses
- Municipal Palace – this colonial building dates from the nineteenth century. Currently, it is used as administrative and government offices of San Pedro Tlaquepaque. On the second floor is the mural "Historia de Fuego" by the artist Camilo Ramírez and the large format painting "Yolotl" by Eusebio Sánchez Benítez; worthy of admiration.
- El Parián – This famous and typical building that characterizes San Pedro Tlaquepaque is a place of family gathering and recreation and place for civic and social festivities. It currently has 18 restaurants and bars.
- Andador Independencia. - Andador with art galleries, artisan shops, old houses, the Regional Ceramics Museum, bars and restaurants.
- Centro Cultural el Refugio.- in 1885, Fray Argoello began the construction of this building, which functioned as a general and psychiatric hospital and was built in various stages. Currently, it is the Center for Congresses, Conventions, Exhibitions and Special Events. In its facilities are the School of Plastic Arts, Crafts and Crafts "Angel Carranza" and the Museum of the National Prize for Ceramics "Pantaleón Panduro".
- El Refugio Cultural Center.
- Panduro Pantaleon Museum. - Museum of the National Prize for Ceramics "Pantaleón Panduro".- The museum is located on the premises of the Cultural Center el Refugio. It houses the winning pieces of the National Prize for Ceramics, the same from different states of the Mexican Republic.
- Regional Ceramics Museum – The museum has eight exhibition halls, containing pieces from different regions of Jalisco and Mexico; including the miniatures of the Tlaquepanse Angel Carranza. In addition, an extra room, is dedicated to art and culture exhibitions.
- Parish of San Pedro Tlaquepaque
- Juarez Street.
- Sanctuary of the Holy Mexican Martyrs – The martyrs gave their lives for Christ and for Our Lady, so this sanctuary fulfills the mission of remembering those who with their blood fed the faith of the Mexican people. In fact, most of these martyrs were from Guadalajara or passed through this city during the persecution of the 1920s. Today, recalls Héctor Castellanos, the Guadalajara seminary has about 1,000 seminarians and is one of the most important in the world. The origin of the construction has a double slope, on the one hand because of the needs of the Diocese when it comes to mass acts, and on the other of a desire of St. John Paul II to investigate and give value to the Mexican victims of religious persecution.
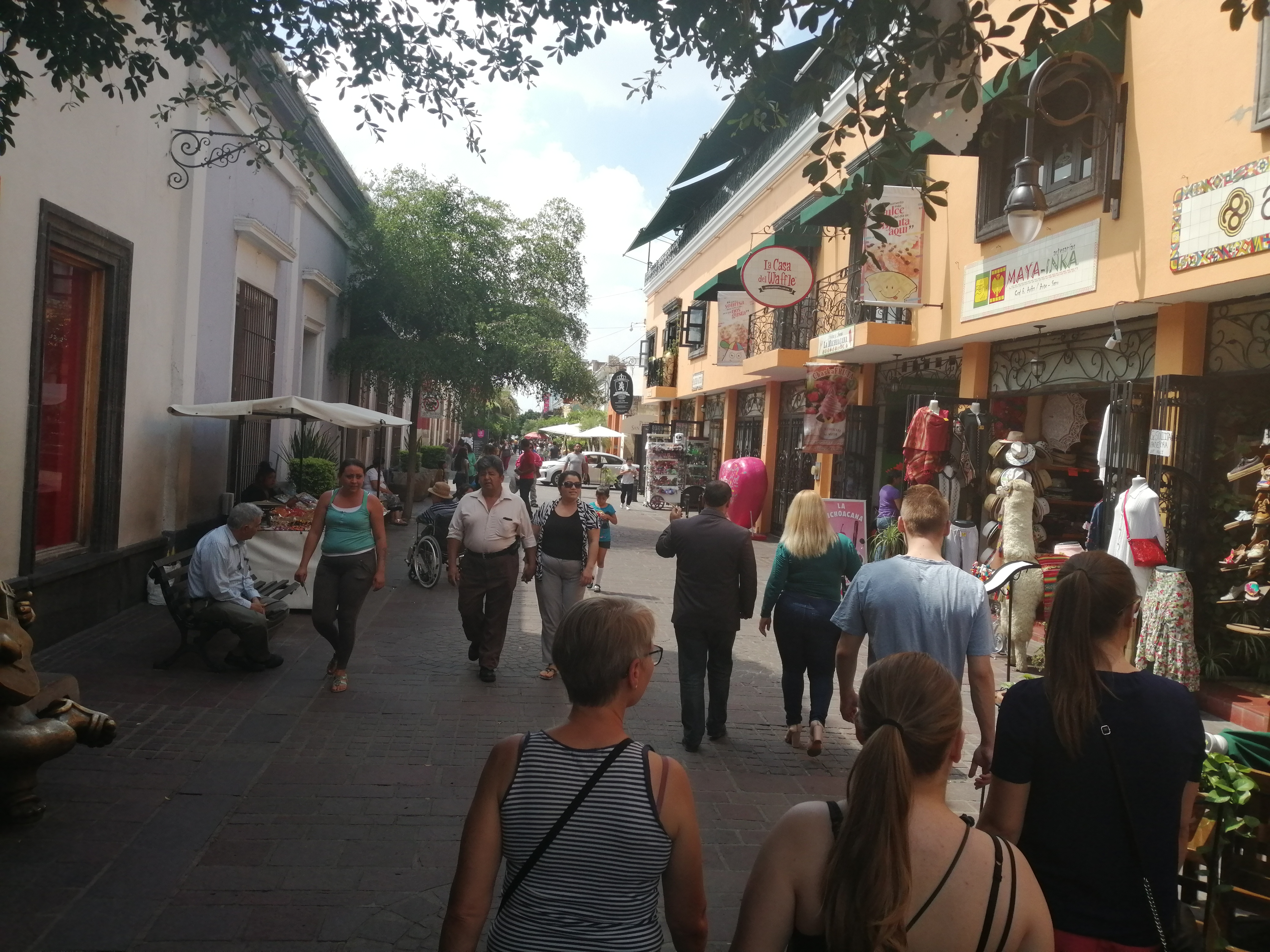
Andador indepedencia

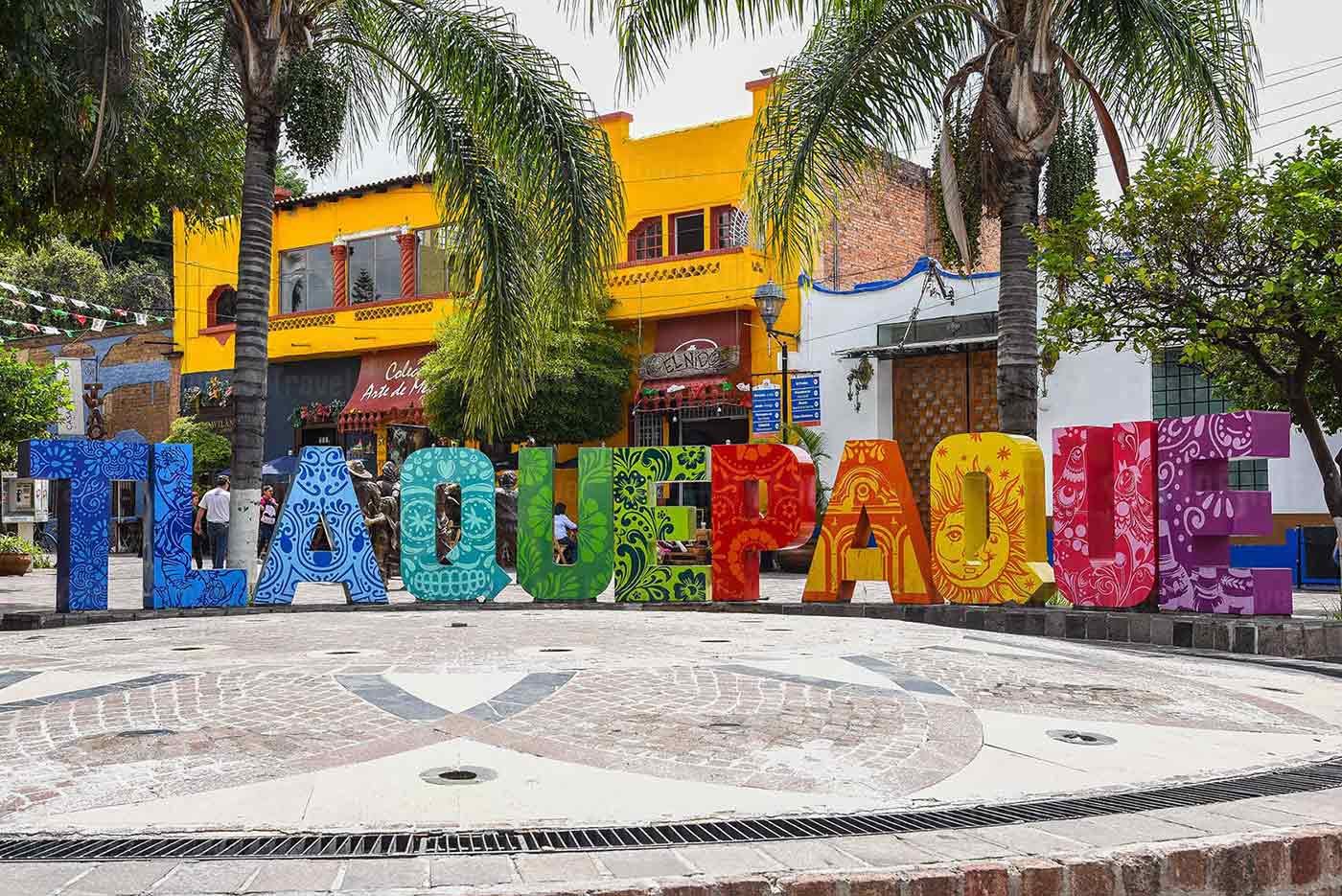
Giant Tlaquepaque Letters

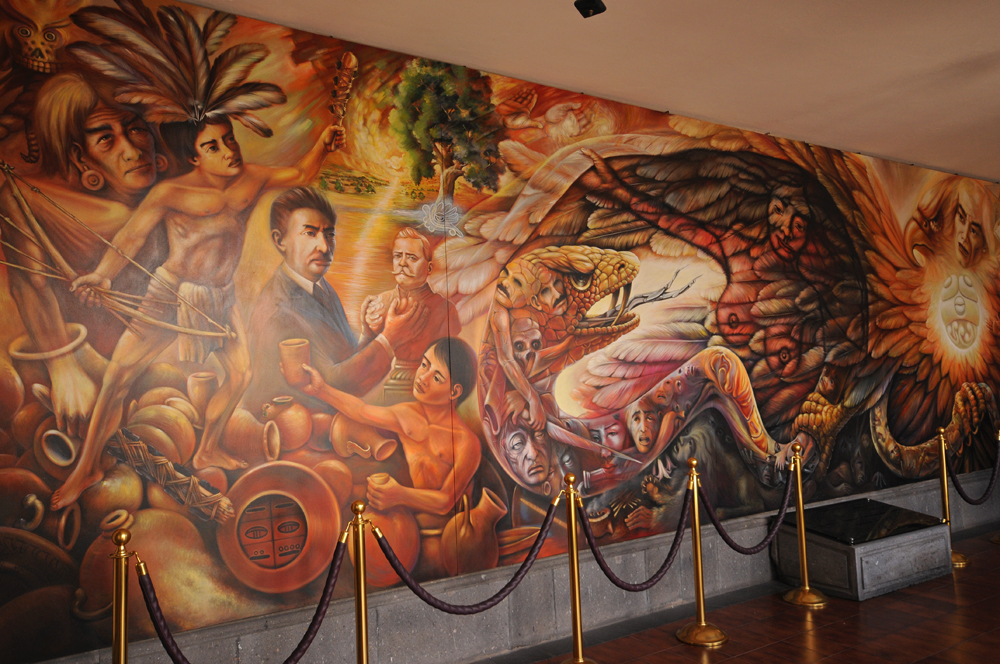
Yolotl Mural

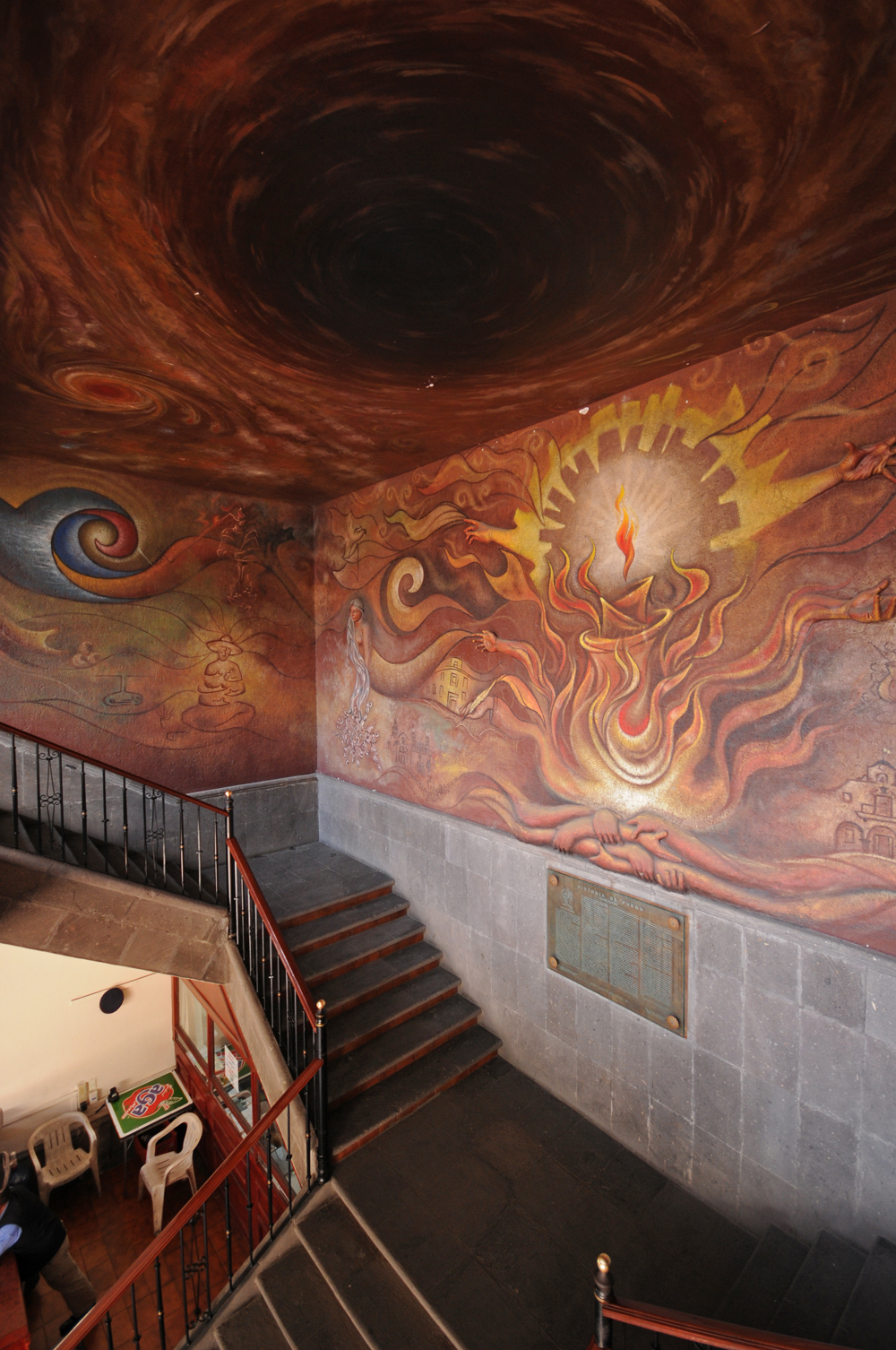
Fire Mural

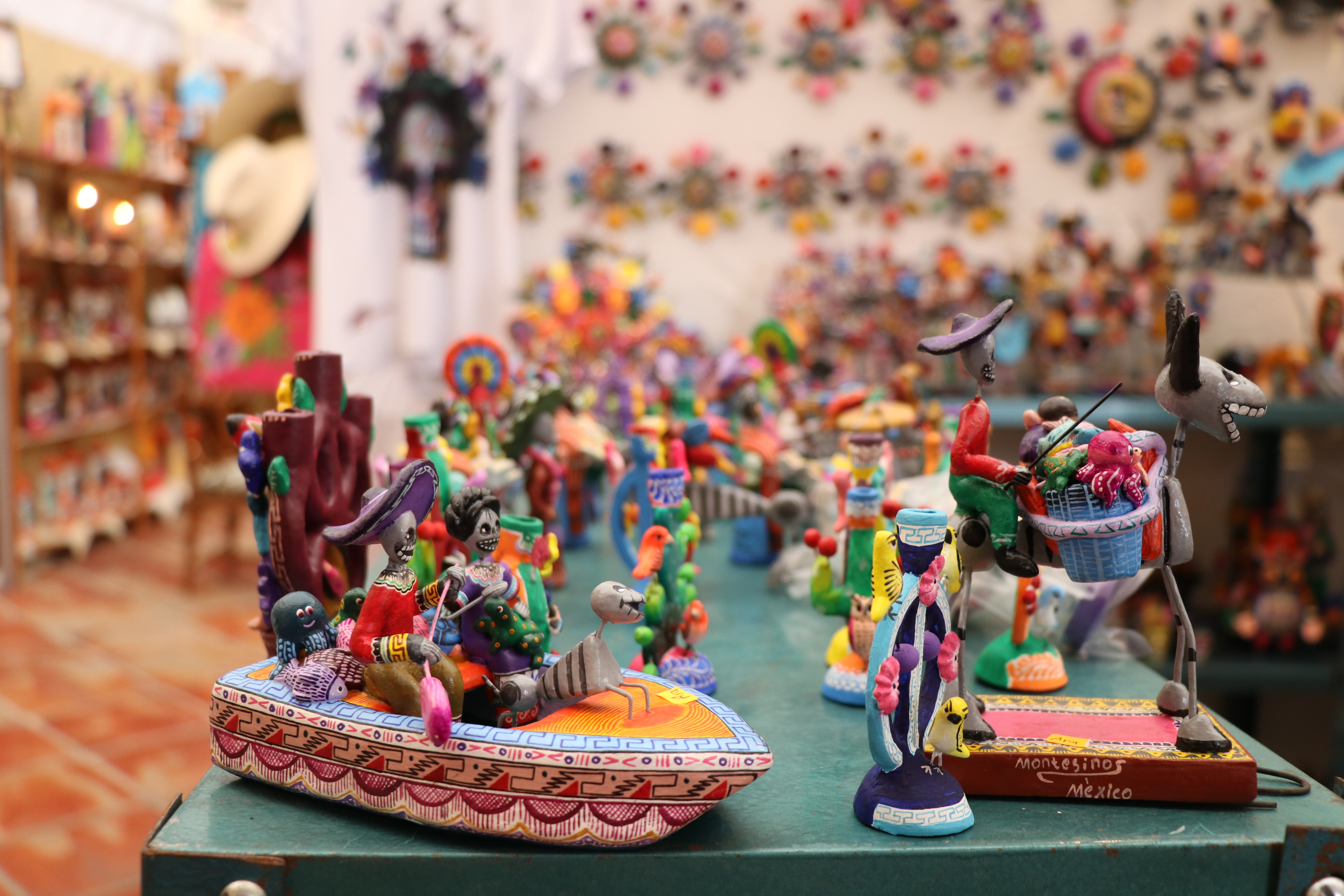
Pottery Store

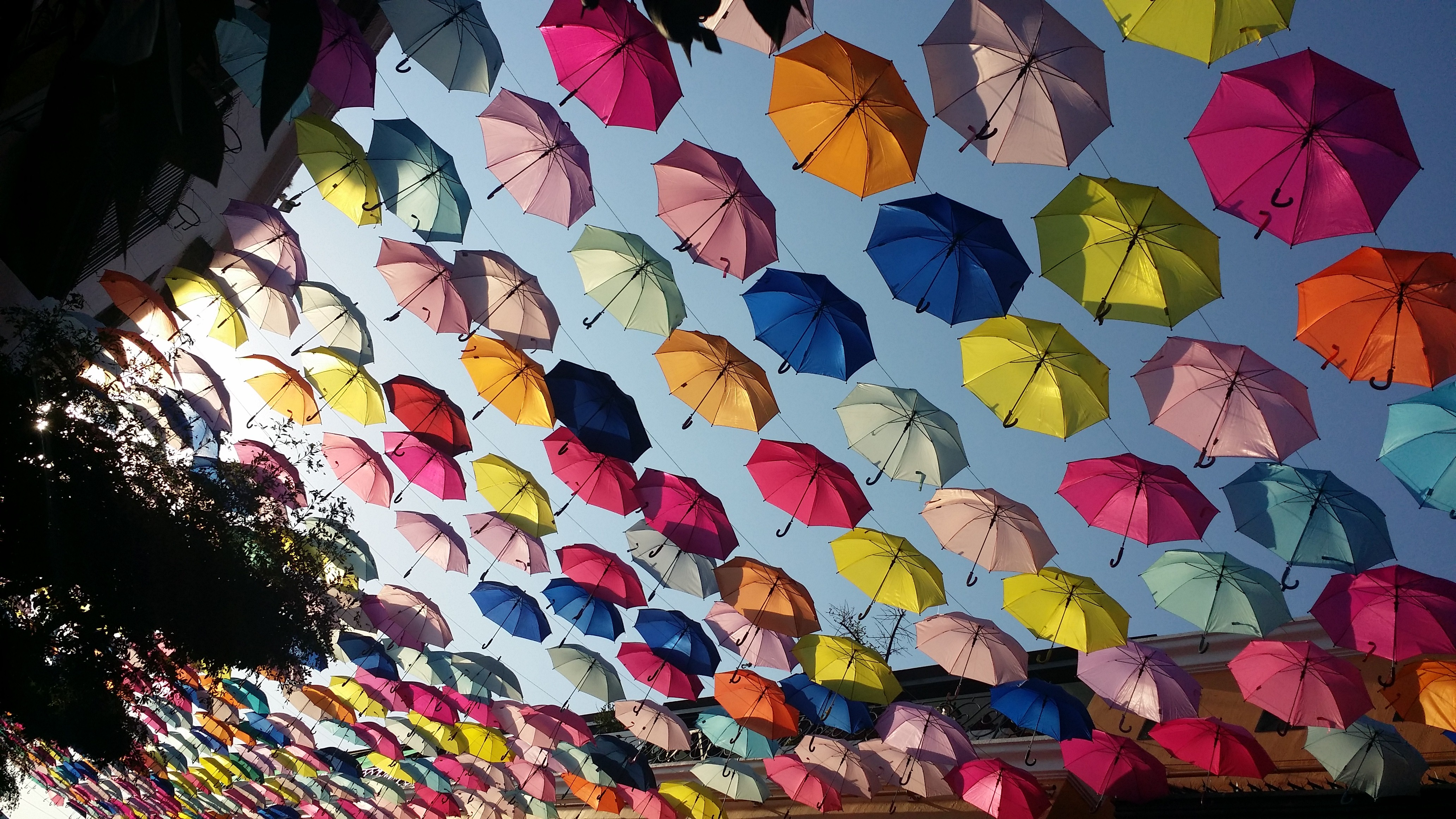
Street Decor – Suspended Colorful Umbrellas

== Main sights ==
Tlaquepaque features El Parián, a large plaza flanked by columned arcades and surrounded by restaurants and bars.

=== Jardín Hidalgo ("Hidalgo Garden") ===
Jardín Hidalgo

The main plaza in the city centre, named after one of its dominating features, the larger-than-life statue of the "Father of Mexican Independence," Miguel Hidalgo y Costilla.

Other main features include the two important churches, Santuario de Nuestra Señora de la Soledad (The Sanctuary of Our Lady of Solitude) and Parroquia de San Pedro Apóstol (Saint Peter), and the Benito Juárez market.

== Culture ==
Tlaquepaque is known for its mariachi bands. During the annual San Pedro festivities, El Jardín is filled with stalls and street sellers. On the day of San Pedro itself, towering firework-festooned structures known as the Castillo ("castle") and Toro ("bull") are set alight.

== Etymology ==
The native name has its etymology in the same land. The word "Tlaquepaque" means "Place on knolls of clay land," although there are other versions that are inclined to "men who craft clay pieces ("Tlacapan")". For others, the word "Tlaquepaque" comes from the word "Tlalipac", "on mud knolls". Yet another etymology says that it means "place of mud."

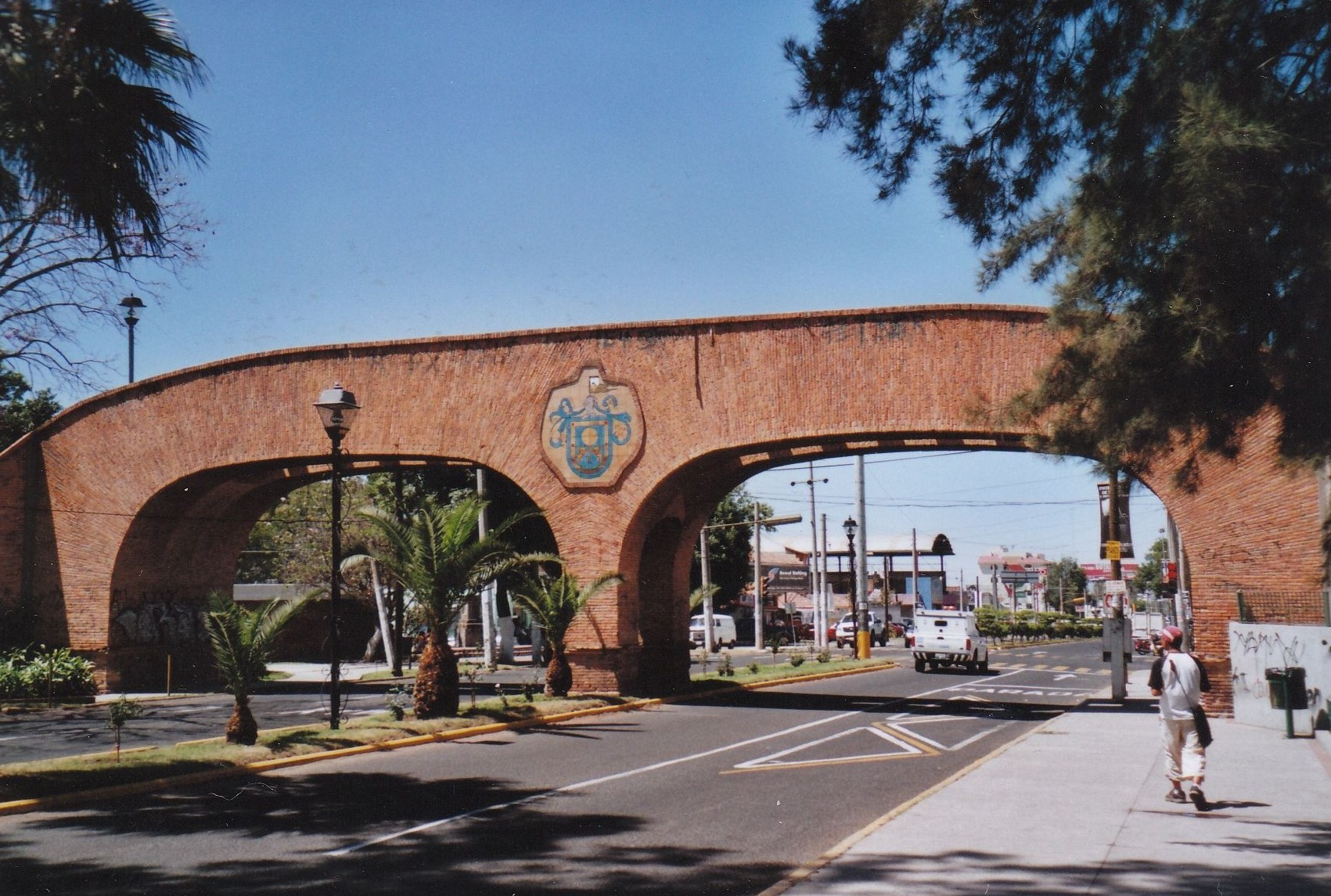
Puente Artesanal

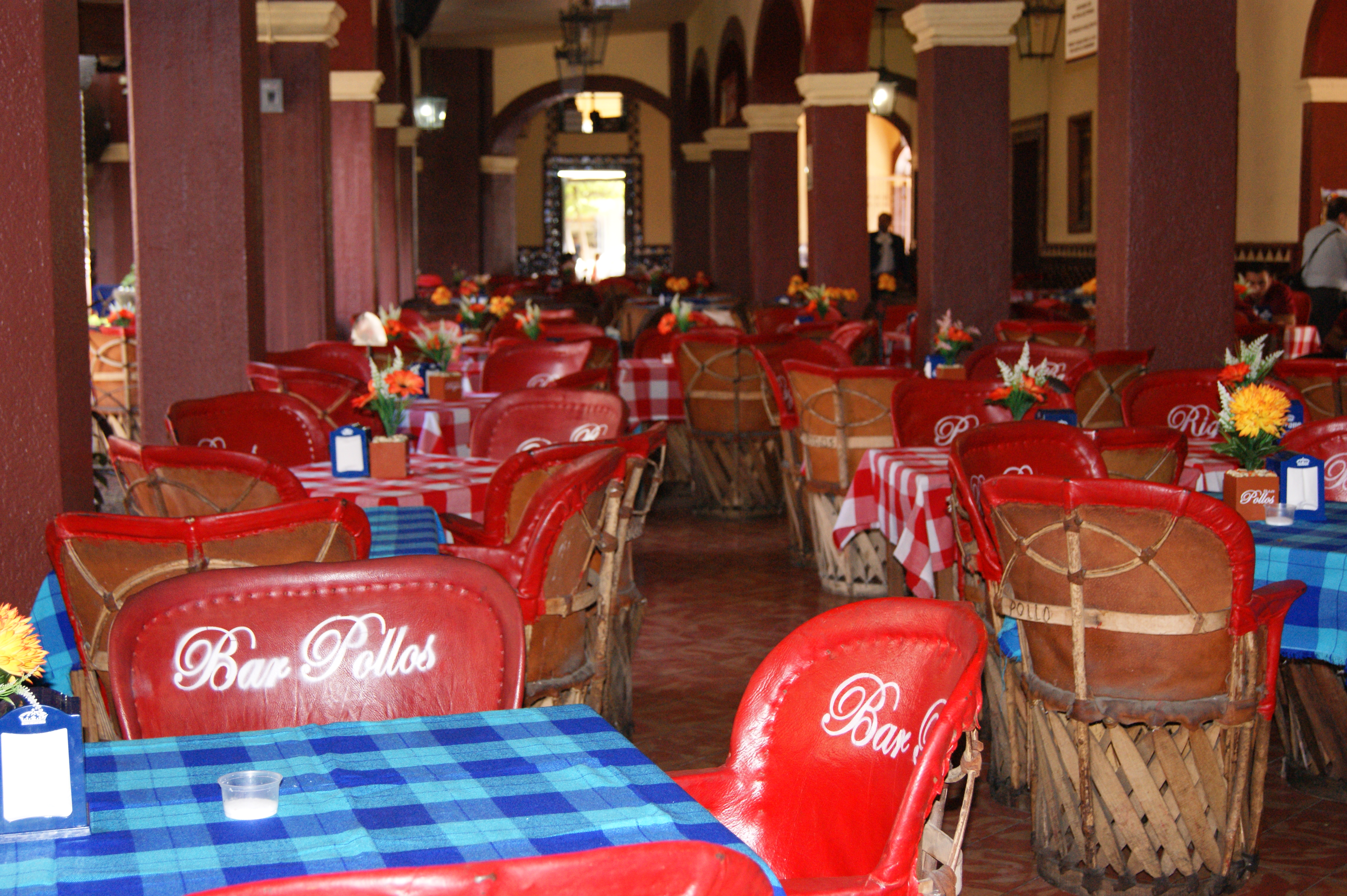
El Parian in Tlaquepaque

=== Recovery of the original name ===
As established in the initiative that the municipal president sent to the State Congress, in 1843 San Pedro Tlaquepaque was granted the category of Villa, a name he kept until 1917, when by decree of the then governor Manuel Aguirre Berlanga, prohibited in Jalisco using the name of saints in streets, squares, parks, as well as "living people, animals or other frivolous designations". The ban did not include municipalities, but San Pedro Tlaquepaque lost the first part of its original name.

Currently, the municipality of Tlaquepaque recovered its full name San Pedro Tlaquepaque, an initiative carried out by the municipal president, Miguel Castro Reynoso. Before seeking recovery, the City Council of Tlaquepaque carried out a consultation between residents of the municipality, both the head and other delegations. The polls were available to citizens from 20 September to 8 October 2010 and 13,043 people participated. The result was that 62.4 percent of the people consulted are in favor of the municipality being renamed San Pedro Tlaquepaque; 37.2 percent to stay as is and 0.4 percent did not answer. The results of the consultation were the basis for the agreement that the plenary session of the City of Tlaquepaque took on 11 November 2010, through which the municipal president was authorized to present to the State Congress an initiative to request the name change, as well as the modification of article 4 of the Law of Government and Municipal Public Administration, which establishes the list of municipalities that make up Jalisco.

On 21 June 2011, the Constitutional Points Commission of the State Congress approved the opinion through which the name change is authorized, so on 27 September 2011 the State Congress approved that the municipality of Tlaquepaque return to its original name, that is, San Pedro.

Tlaquepaque is also known for its famous tepache, a partially fermented drink made with pineapple, brown sugar and water.

== Sister cities ==
- Antigua Guatemala, Guatemala
- Atwater, California, United States
- Cancún, Quintana Roo, Mexico
- Glendale, California, United States
- Metepec, State of Mexico, Mexico
- Oaxaca, Oaxaca, Mexico
- Old Havana, Cuba
- San Joaquín, Querétaro, Mexico
- San Miguel de Cozumel, Quintana Roo, Mexico
- Springfield, Missouri, United States
- Zapotiltic, Jalisco, Mexico

== See also ==
- Symbols of Tlaquepaque
