= Copal (disambiguation) =

Copal is a type of resin.

Copal may also refer to:

- Bursera glabrifolia, a tree commonly used in woodcarving
- Bursera bipinnata, another species of Bursera, also used in woodcarving
- Nidec Copal Corporation, a Japanese photographic, electronic, optical and mechanical manufacturer

== See also ==
- Copal tree (disambiguation)
