= Handcrafts and folk art in Mexico City =

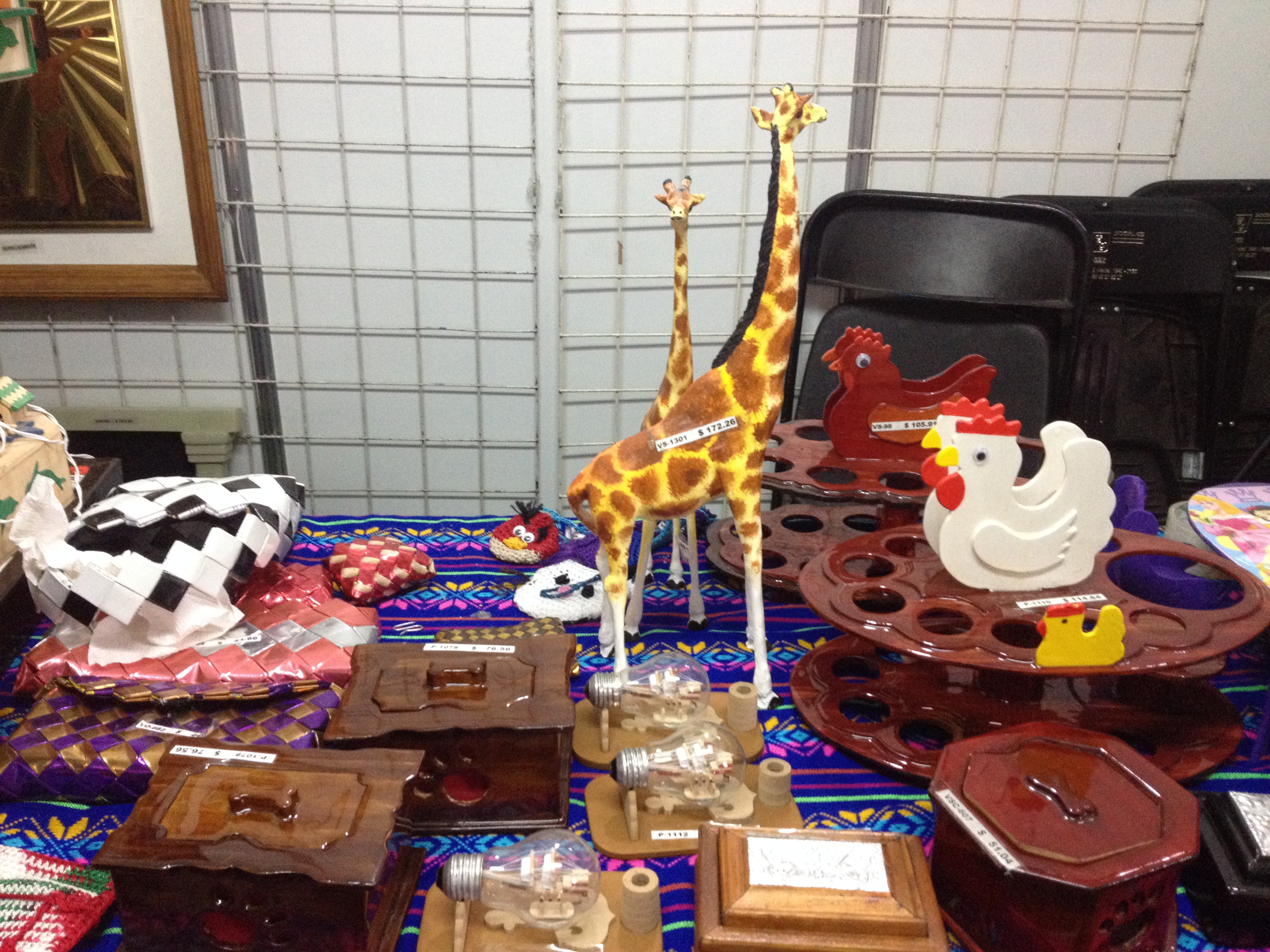
Handcrafts made as part of a prison program in Mexico City

Handcrafts and folk art in Mexico City is a microcosm of handcraft production in most of the rest of country. One reason for this is that the city has attracted migration from other parts of Mexico, bringing these crafts. The most important handcraft in the city is the working of a hard paper mache called cartonería, used to make piñatas and other items related to various annual celebrations. It is also used to make fantastic creatures called alebrijes, which originated here in the 20th century. While there are handcrafts made in the city, the capital is better known for selling and promoting crafts from other parts of the country, both fine, very traditional wares and inexpensive curio types, in outlets from fine shops to street markets.

== History ==
Historically, the Valley of Mexico became a center for goods produced in Mesoamerica with the rise of the Aztec Empire, bringing worked goods into the area both through trade and tribute. After the fall of Tenochtitlan in 1521, this system of tribute continued, with Spanish systems added, such as the rise of guilds to produce a number of items. However, many of the indigenous crafts survived.

In 1529 Pedro de Gante founded the first handcraft school in the city, at the Chapel of San Jose de los Naturales of the San Francisco monastery. This began the process of mixing native and European influences in these trades, especially in aesthetics. The school did not last long because native artisans had a well-developed handcraft tradition that allowed them to adapt European technologies such as the potters wheel and the pedal loom, quickly.

Handcrafts continued to be produced in the Valley of Mexico, although some, like basketry, essentially disappeared as raw materials did. The Mexican Revolution prompted a migration into the city, which continues to this day, bringing craftsmen with new products and/or techniques. For this reason, the capital is a kind of microcosm of the various handcrafts of the country.

While workshops used to be organized in the city according to type, for example the old Plateros (silversmiths) Street (now Madero), today, shops and workshops are dispersed throughout the city in no systematic fashion with artisan families in eight of the city’s boroughs. However, according to Museo de Arte Popular director Walther Boelsterly, the working of crafts is disappearing in the capital as the pay is too low for many to continue, and raw materials becoming scarce or too expensive.

Federal, city and private organization have worked to preserve and promote handcraft making of various types for both cultural and economic reasons. One private initiative was the Miss Lupita project, with the aim of revitalizing a type of doll making that has all but disappeared.

== Cartoneria and alebrijes ==
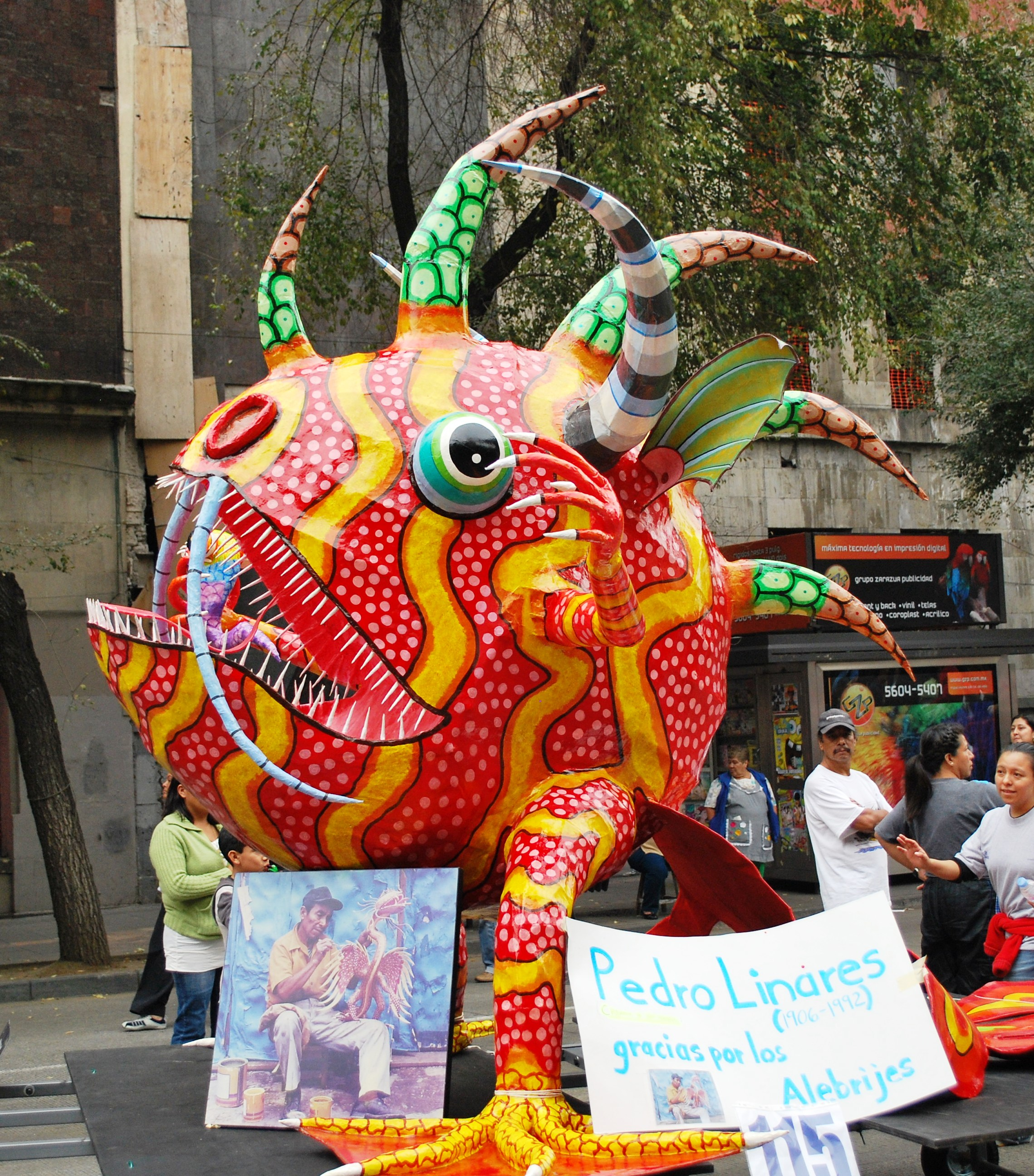
Alebrije dedicated to Pedro Linares

Mexico City has a long tradition of making objects from a hard kind of paper mache called cartonería, generally for the various festival and celebrations of the year. It is a major industry, with various families and individuals noted for this work, including the Linares family and Susana Buyo, nicknamed “Señora de los Monstruos” (Lady of the Monsters) .

Generally located in poor neighborhoods, workshops produced a variety of objects, mostly connected with holidays such as Day of the Dead, Christmas, and Holy Saturday (Holy Week). Piñatas are produced year-round, both for the Christmas season it is originally associated with to other kinds of celebrations such as birthday parties. Originally, piñatas were made with clay pots, and these are still made in some places, but more often piñatas are made with cartoneria, in a wide variety of shapes and sizes. Another traditional use for cartonería is the making of “Judas” figures. Designed to represent Judas Iscariot as the personification of evil, traditionally these are in a form of a devil and exploded by lighting the various fireworks attached to the figure. These can be quite large, generally up to four meters but can be taller. Today, these figures can be in other shapes, either fantastic creatures, but more often in the form of famous people, who have found disfavor with people for one reason or another. A more recent use for cartonería is the making of decorative items in relation to Day of the Dead, especially skeletal figures.

An innovation in cartonería is attributed to the Linares family, more specifically to Pedro Linares in the mid 20th century. These are fantastic creatures painted in bright colors, and one of the few handcrafts, if not the only, that is characteristic of the city. These are amalgams of parts from various real or fantastic creatures, often using wire frames to support the body (especially for large pieces) and/or delicate protrusions.

== Other crafts ==
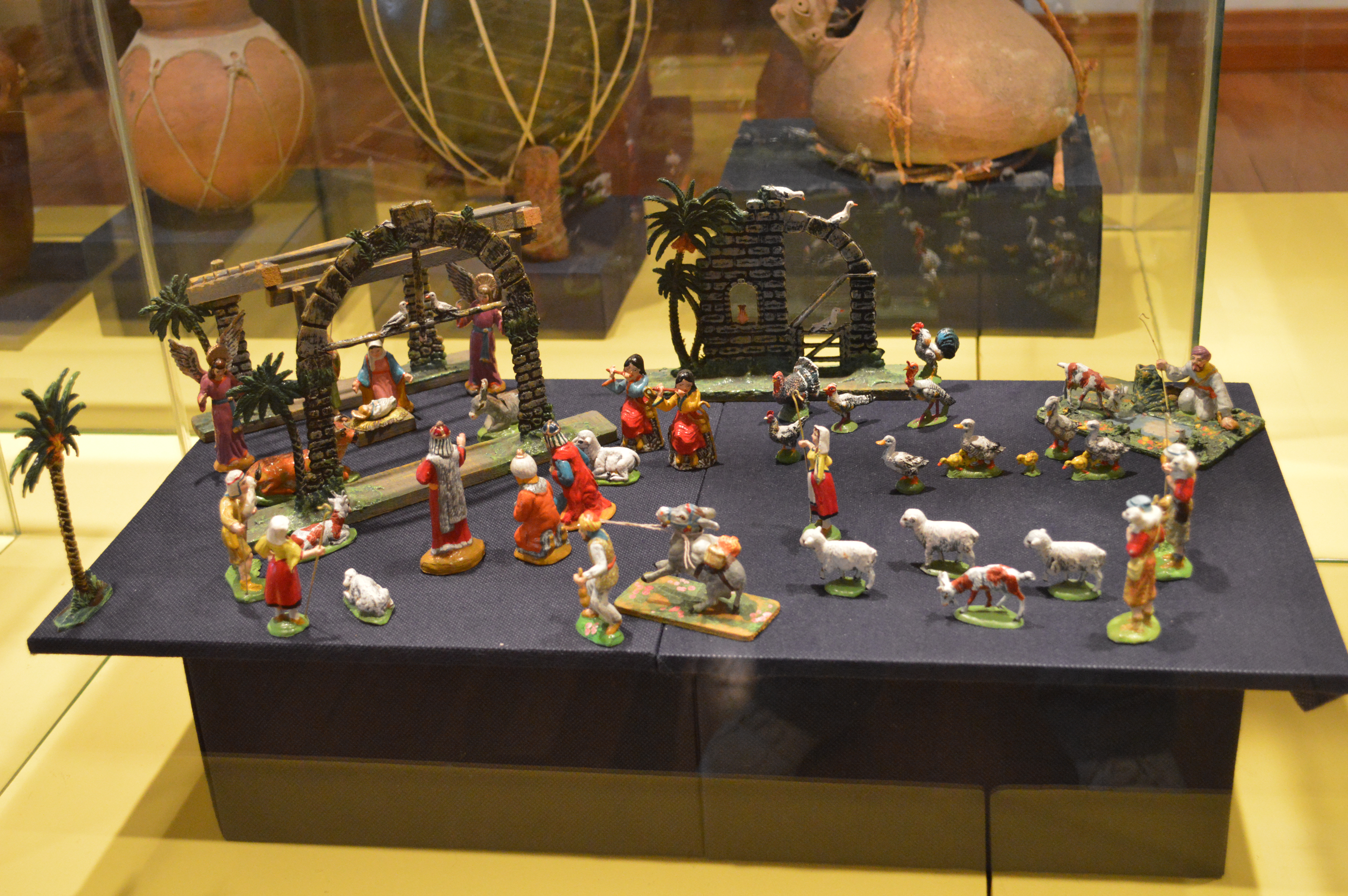
Lead miniature nativity scene from the city on display at the Railway Museum in San Luis Potosí

The working of fine metals and (semi) precious stones is still important here and has its origin in the pre Hispanic period when the city became powerful enough to receive these goods as tribute items. Gold, silver, copper and stones such as malachite and onyx are commonly worked. Silver is fashioned into trays, bowls, cups, and jewelry, both in modern and traditional designs. Gold is generally used for jewelry. Malachite and onyx are often worked into pre Hispanic themed decorative objects and lamp bases. Another metal is pewter, usually worked into objects such as mugs, ashtrays, candle holders, plates, frame, etc.

Figures and miniatures are usually made in clay or lead. In the city, the most common theme for this is the Mexica (Aztec) culture, but other indigenous cultures are also represented. There is also an industry which makes glass miniatures of animals, lamps, carrousels and more.

Wood crafts include small objects such as toys (tops, yoyos, puppets, etc.) along with furniture, mostly reproductions of colonial era pieces. Other objects include guitars, masks and replicas of the Tizoc Stone, often covered in lacquer or crystal pieces. Papel picado (lit. poked paper) is the cutting of thin paper generally with a chisel or similar instrument to create repeating banner-like decorative items for festivals and parties. Originally, these were made with amate or maguey paper due to its pre Hispanic origin, but eventually crepe paper began to be used, and sometimes this is replaced by thin sheets of plastic.

Textile production techniques generally come from other parts of Mexico, brought by indigenous peoples who have migrated to the city. There are also workshops that make items for charros such as sombreros, charro suits, boots, silver accessories and saddles.

The working of glass was introduced to the area after being established first in Puebla. One notable works is that of Felipe Derfingher (today Derfingher Feder), a descendant of German glass artisans. Their work includes products of glass combined with other materials such as metals.

A number of crafts are associated with construction, given the city’s long history of being an architectural showpiece. This has allowed certain activities such as stone hewing and artistic wrought iron to survive, reinforced by the desire to preserve heritage.

== The city’s role as handcraft vendor ==
The metropolitan area is more noted for its role in the sale of handcrafts and folk art rather than production. The handcrafts that are sold here divide between the traditional or fine work, and those made economically, mostly as curios for tourists.

The finest of Mexican handcrafts, usually produced for collectors, are found in specialty shops and government sponsored outlets such as those operated by FONART, which has received famous shoppers including Bill Clinton in 2012. These stores contain authentic pieces from the country’s most prominent artisans. Other known establishments include Parakata in the historic center, the gift shop of the Museo de Arte Popular, Tonalli Artesana Prehispanica in Colonial Juarez and the shops in the center of the San Angel neighborhood in the south of the city. One exception to this rule is the availability of handwoven baskets from various states in central Mexico at the La Merced Market.

Lower quality wares and souvenir type merchandise can be found in established stores, traditional style fixed markets and street markets called “tianguis.” La Ciudadela is a fixed traditional market on one side of the Plaza La Ciudadela (far southwest corner of the historic center). It was established for the 1968 Olympics to promote Mexican handcrafts and has remained since. It carries a wide variety of goods from jewelry to toys to furniture. The Mercado Sonora is another fixed market in the Venustiano Carranza borough. It is best known for its herbal medicine and witchcraft supplies but handcrafts such as baskets, dolls, clothes and pottery. The historic center of Coyoacán has a tianguis type market, but is permanent. This was created in the 2010s to move vendors from off the main plaza. It mostly sells cheaper, curio style handcrafts. The Centro Artesanal Plaza Garibali is located in a three-floor building facing the plaza that lends its name. The first floor has small items such as religious articles, dolls and clothes. The upper two floors have larger items as well as sombreros and gear for charros. The San Juan Handcrafts Market is located in the historic center. It has a bland facade with a number of stalls inside. The lobby has a photo exhibition of the history of the market. The Centro Artesanal Buenavista is located in the Colonia Guerrero neighborhood, just north of the city center. It has over 10,000 providers and not only sells handcrafts from Mexico but also from all over the world.

== Institutions related to handcrafts and folk art ==
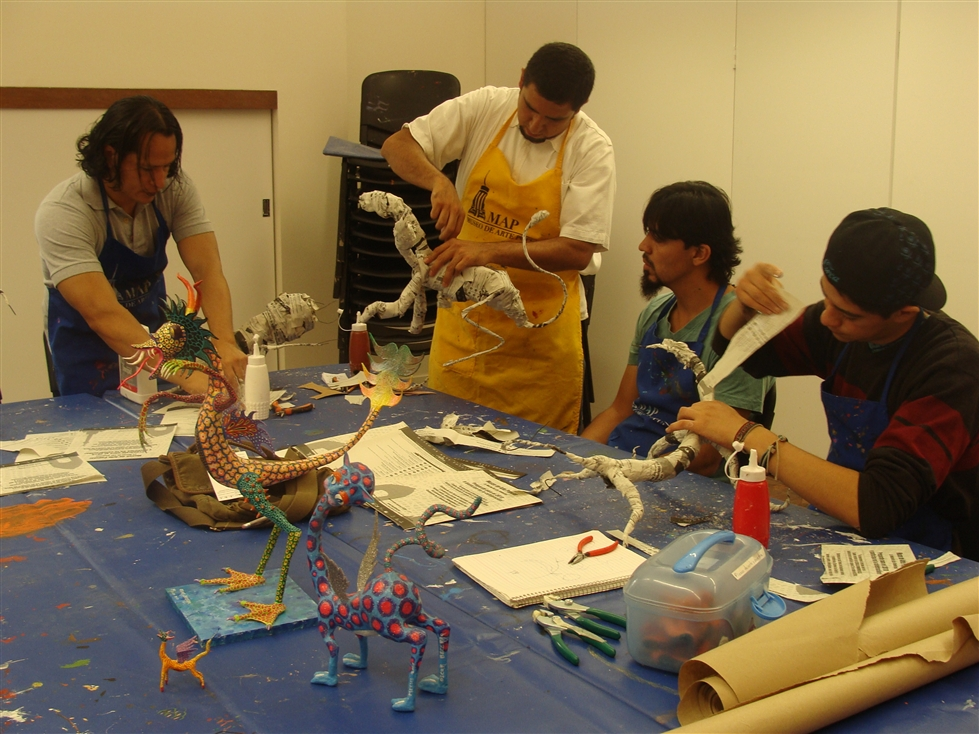
Cartonería workshop at the Museo de Arte Popular

One way that the continued existence of handcrafts is encourage is through courses in various institutions. The Secretaría de Educación Pública runs a number of training programs for those interested in traditional handcrafts and other trades. They have an Escuela de Artesanías (Handcrafts School) that offers courses in ceramics, glazing, printmaking, jewelry making, metal work, textiles and glass work. A city-run institution is the Fábrica de Artes y Oficios Oriente, which is dedicated to training poorer city residents mostly in marketable skills, which does include some traditional handcrafts, such as cartonería, carpentry and metal working. The first facility was established in the east of the city, and its success has led to the opening of three more.

The city has a major handcraft and folk art museum called the Museo de Arte Popular, opened in 2006. Its purpose is to serve as a reference for Mexican crafts as well as promoting them through workshops, and other events to both Mexico and foreign tourism. and dignify Mexican crafts though restoration of older works and the promotion of their creation both inside and outside the museum itself. The museum sponsors classes for children and adults on weekends to preserve these traditions.

The city holds various events related to handcrafts, such as the National Handcrafts Festival (Feria Nacional Artesanal) in Coyoacán, and a Cartonería Fair to preserve and promote the craft in the city. The Museo de Arte Popular sponsors an annual Monumental Alebrije Parade, also known as Night of the Alebrijes, when very large versions of cartonería alebrijes are wheeled along Paseo de la Reforma. The participating alebrijes are made new each year.

== Notable artisans ==
- Pedro Linares
- Linares family (alebrijes and cartonería)
- Ana Karen Allende
- Pedro Preux
