= Bursera (disambiguation) =

Bursera refers to a genus of plants with about 100 described species

It also refers to:

Botany

- Bursera graveolens, known in Spanish as palo santo ("Holy Wood”), is a wild tree in South America
- Bursera bipinnata is a Mesoamerican species of trees widespread across Mexico and Central America
- Bursera excelsa, the copal, is a species of plants found along the Pacific coast of Mexico.
- Bursera glabrifolia is a species of tree native to central Mexico
- Burseraceae are a moderate-sized family of 17-19 genus and about 540 species of flowering plants.

Geography

- Bursera, Bokaro, a census town in Jharkhand, India
