= Copal tree =

Copal tree may refer to several tree species:

== Trees yielding copal resin ==
- Protium copal, a tree endemic to Mexico and Central America
- Hymenaea courbaril, also called Brazilian copal tree, a tree common in the Caribbean, Central America, and South America
- Hymenaea verrucosa, also called Zanzibar copal tree, a tree native to tropical East Africa

== Trees yielding copal wood (used in woodcarving) ==
- Bursera bipinnata, a tree widespread across Mexico and Central America
- Bursera glabrifolia, a tree native to central Mexico
