= Alebrije =

Mexican folk art sculptures

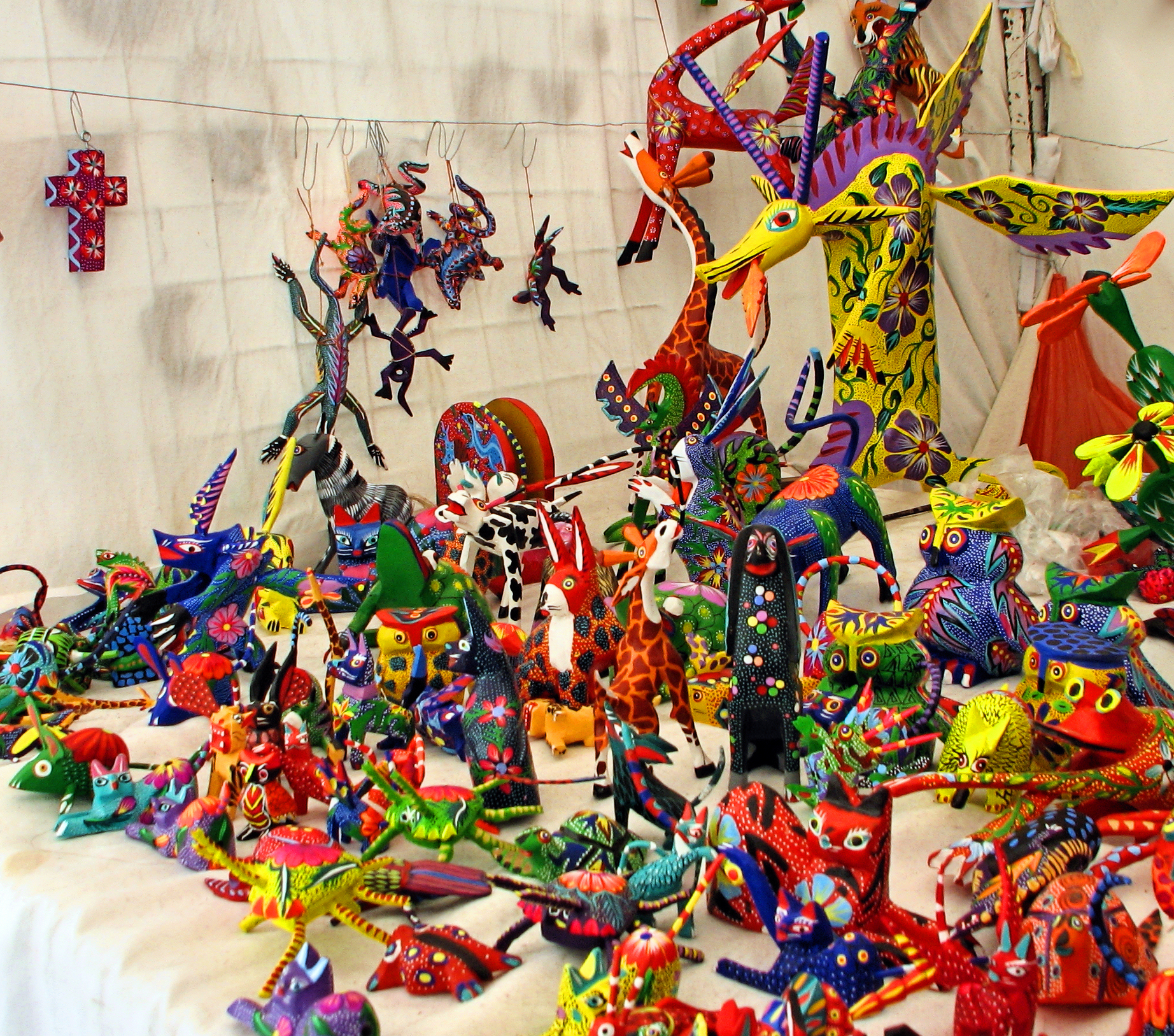
Alebrijes at the Pochote Market in the city of Oaxaca

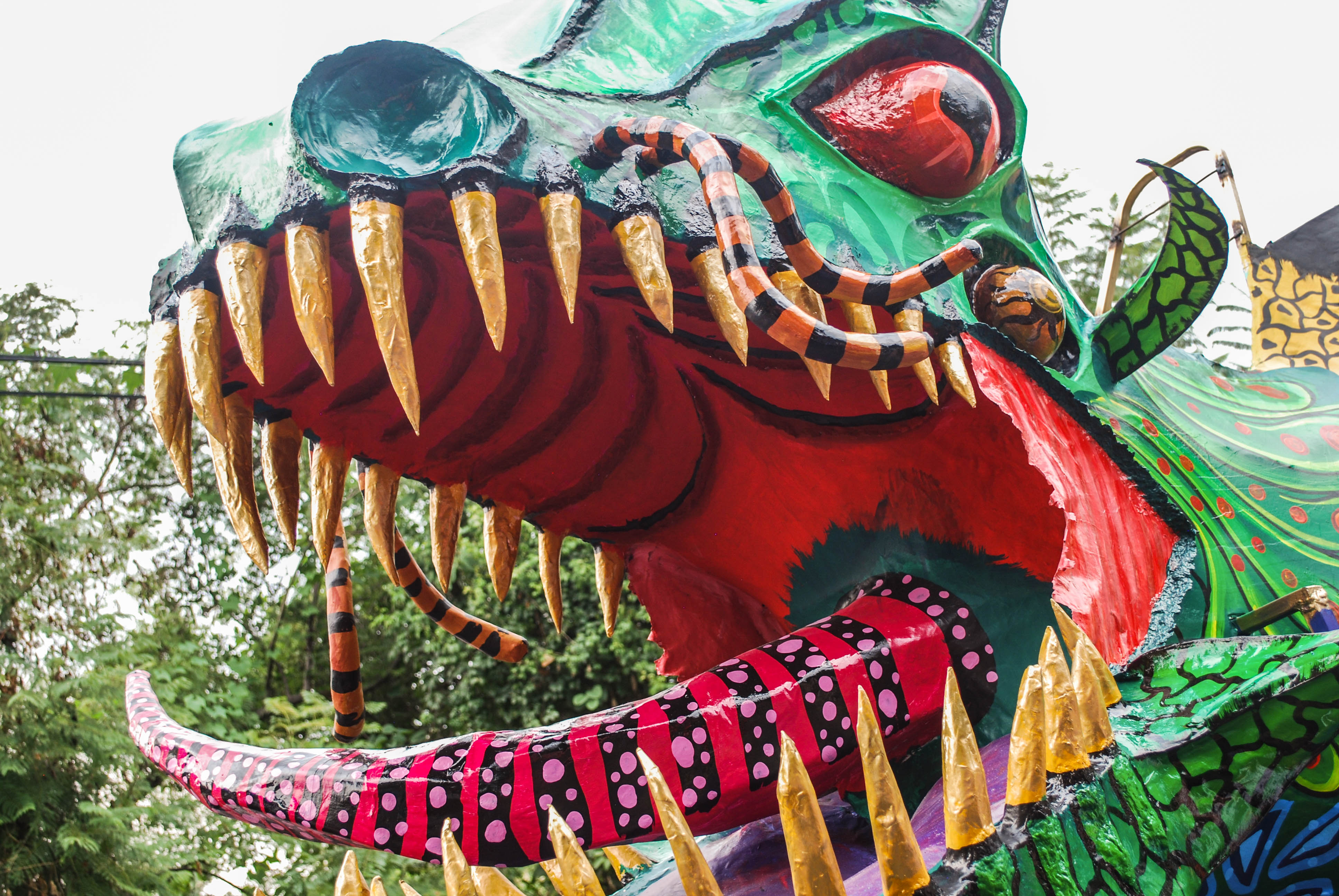
Zacualpan Mojiganga 070

Animation clip (in Spanish) about alebrijes made by the Museo de Arte Popular in collaboration with Wiki Learning, Tec de Monterrey

Alebrijes (Spanish pronunciation: [aleˈβɾixes]) are brightly colored Mexican folk art sculptures of fantastical (fantasy/mythical) creatures, traditionally made from papier-mâché or wood. The art form originated in Mexico City in 1936, when Pedro Linares López, a papier-mâché artist, began creating surreal, dreamlike creatures after having a dream during an illness. His designs, which combined elements of various animals, became widely recognized as alebrijes and were later adopted by artisans in Oaxaca, who began carving them from copal wood, a local softwood.

Alebrijes are now a significant part of Mexican folk art, blending the tradition of cartonería with modern artistic expression. They are often associated with Día de Muertos (Day of the Dead), though they are not traditionally part of the holiday's customs. Today, alebrijes are crafted in various regions of Mexico and have gained international recognition, appearing in exhibitions, festivals, and even contemporary media.

== Description ==
The first alebrijes originated in Mexico City, originally created by 'cartonero' artist Pedro Linares. Linares often said that in 1936, he fell very ill. While he was in bed unconscious, he dreamt of a strange place resembling a forest. There, he saw trees, rocks, and clouds that suddenly transformed into strange, unknown animals. He saw "a donkey with butterfly wings, a rooster with bull horns, and a lion with an eagle head," and all of them were shouting one word "Alebrijes! Alebrijes! Alebrijes!" Upon recovery, he began recreating the creatures that he had seen in cartonería, the making of three-dimensional sculptures with different types of papers, strips of papers, and "engrudo" (glue made out of wheat flour and water).

His work caught the attention of artists Diego Rivera and Frida Kahlo because they used to purchase Judas figures from Pedro Linares. In the 1980s, British filmmaker Judith Bronowski arranged an itinerant Mexican art craft demonstration workshop in the United States featuring Pedro Linares, Manuel Jiménez, and Maria Sabina, a textile artisan from Oaxaca. Although the Oaxaca Valley area already had a history of carving animals and other types of figures from wood, artisans from Oaxaca learned of the alebrijes paper-mâché sculptures when Bronowski's workshop took place. Linares demonstrated his designs on family visits. These were adapted to the carving of a local wood called copal; this type of wood is said to be magical, made from united magic. In the 1990s, the artisans of Oaxaca began to use the word Alebrije to designate their figures carved in wood.

The papier-mâché-to-wood carving adaptation was pioneered by Arrazola native Manuel Jiménez. This version of the craft has since spread to several other towns, most notably San Martín Tilcajete and La Unión Tejalapan, and has become a significant source of income for the area, especially for Tilcajete. The success of the craft, however, has led to the depletion of the native copal trees. Attempts to remedy this with reforestation efforts and management of wild copal trees have had limited success. The three towns most closely associated with alebrije production in Oaxaca have produced a number of notable artisans such as Manuel Jiménez, Jacobo Angeles, Julia Fuentes, and Miguel Sandiego.

== Original papercraft alebrijes ==
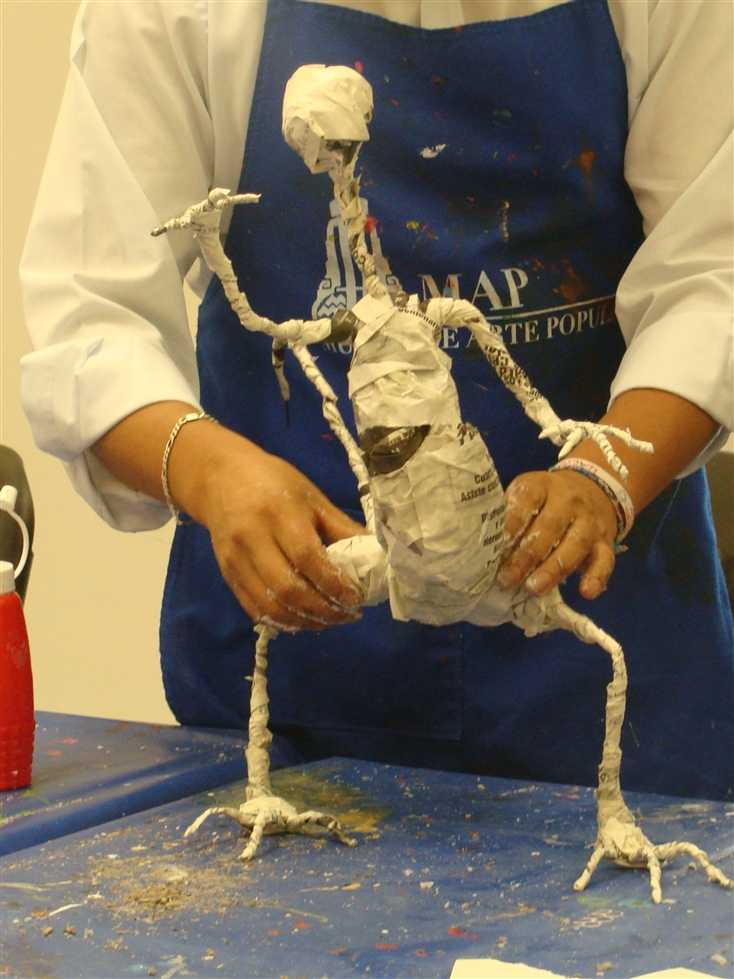
Papier-mâché alebrije in progress at a workshop at the Museo de Arte Popular in Mexico City

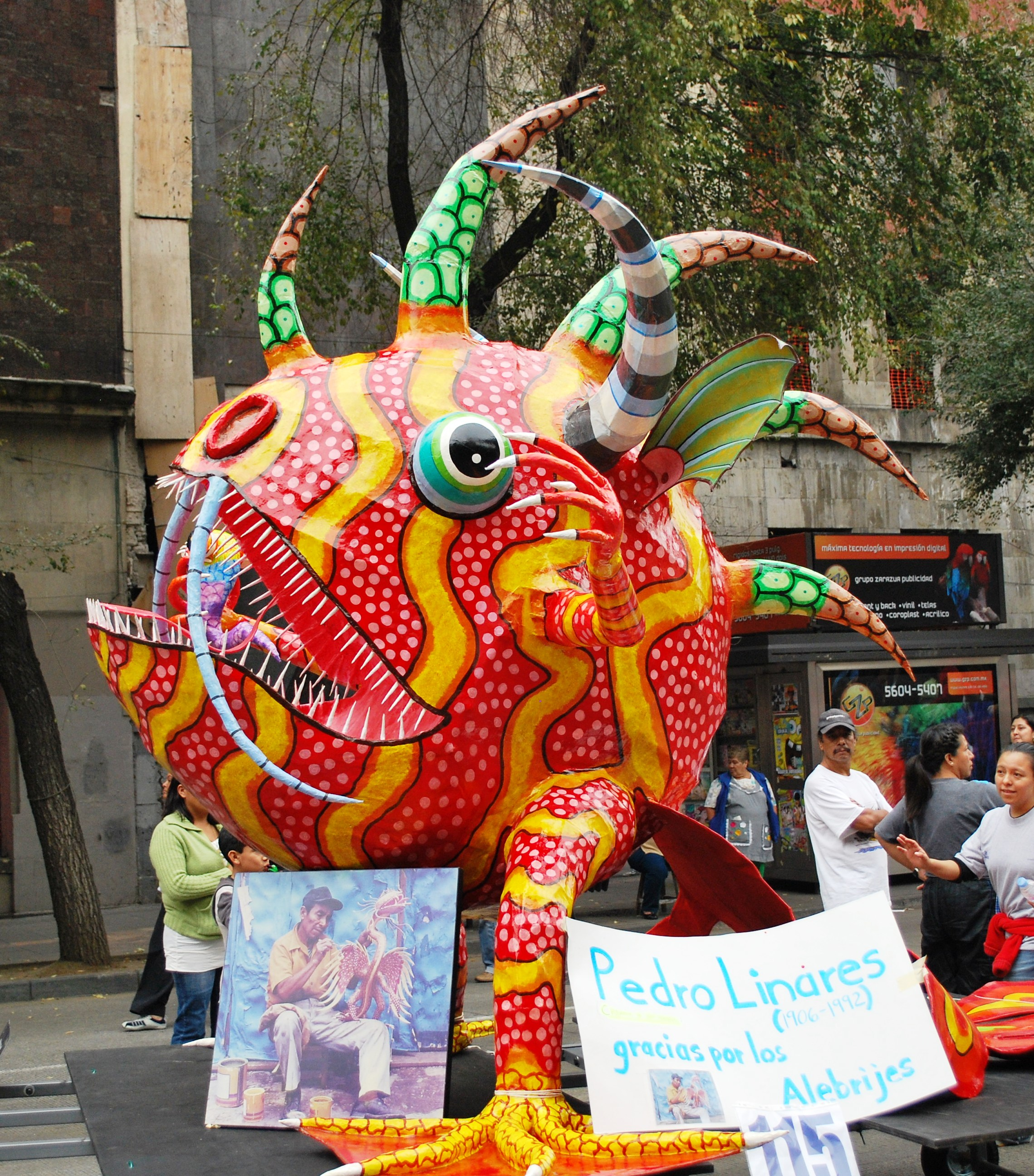
Alebrije named Michin Rojo with salute to Pedro Linares

Alebrijes originated in Mexico City in the 20th century, in 1936. The first alebrijes, as well as the name itself, are attributed to Pedro Linares, an artisan from México City (Distrito Federal), who specialized in making piñatas, carnival masks and "Judas" figures from cartonería, an ancient and widespread papercraft often confused with papier-mâché. He sold his work in markets such as the one in La Merced.

In 1936, when he was 30 years old, Linares fell ill with a high fever, which caused him to hallucinate. In his fever dreams, he was in a forest with rocks and clouds, many of which turned into wild, unnaturally colored creatures, frequently featuring wings, horns, tails, fierce teeth and bulging eyes. He heard a crowd of voices repeating the nonsense word "Alebrije". After he recovered, he began to re-create the creatures he'd seen, using papier-mâché and cardboard. Eventually, a Cuernavaca gallery owner discovered his work. This brought him to the attention of Diego Rivera and Frida Kahlo, who began commissioning more alebrijes. The tradition grew considerably after British filmmaker Judith Bronowski's 1975 documentary on Linares.

Linares received Mexico's National Arts and Sciences Award in the Popular Arts and Traditions category in 1990, two years before he died. This inspired other alebrije artists, and Linares' work became prized both in Mexico and abroad. Rivera said that no one else could have fashioned the strange figures he requested; work done by Linares for Rivera is now displayed at the Anahuacalli Museum in Mexico City.

The descendants of Pedro Linares, such as his son Miguel Linares, his granddaughters Blanca y Elsa Linares, and his grandson Ricardo Linares, live in Mexico City near the Sonora Market and carry on the tradition of making alebrijes and other figures from cardboard and papier-mâché. Their customers have included the Rolling Stones, David Copperfield, and filmmaker Guillermo del Toro. The Stones gave the family tickets to their show. Various branches of the family occupy a row of houses on the same street. Each family works in its own workshops in their own houses, but they will lend each other a hand with big orders. Demand rises and falls; sometimes there is no work, and sometimes families work 18 hours a day.

The original designs for Pedro Linares' alebrijes have fallen into the public domain. However, according to Chapter Three of the 1996 Mexican federal copyright law, it is illegal to sell crafts made in Mexico without acknowledging the community and region they are from, or to alter the crafts in a way that could be interpreted as damaging to the culture's reputation or image. The law applied to the commercialization of the crafts as well as to their public exhibition and the use of their images. This law is rarely enforced; most crafts sellers in Mexico rarely disclose the origin of their products. The name "alebrijes" is used for a wide variety of crafts, even though the Linares family has sought to gain control over the name. The family says that pieces which are not made by them and do not come from Mexico City should state so. The Linares family continues to export their work to the most important galleries showing Mexican art worldwide. For example, "Beasts and Bones: The Cartonería of the Linares Family" in Carlsbad, California, featured about seventy alebrijes and was so popular that it was extended by several weeks.

Because a variety of artists and artisans have been creating alebrijes in their own styles, the craft has become part of Mexico's folk art repertoire. No two alebrijes are exactly alike. Outside of the Linares family, one of the most noted alebrije artists is Susana Buyo, who learned to work with cardboard and papier-mâché at one of the Linares family workshops. Known as the "Señora de los Monstruos" by the local children in Condesa, an upscale neighborhood of Mexico City, she is a native Argentine and naturalized Mexican citizen. Her work can be found across Mexico City and elsewhere, such as those found in Europe. Her work differs from that of the Linares in that many of her designs include human contours, and many have expressions more tender than terrifying. She also uses nontraditional materials such as feathers, fantasy stones, and modern resins, both for novelty and for durability.

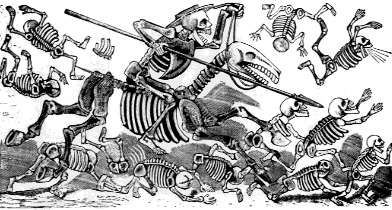
Don Quixote by Jose Guadalupe Posada

While Pedro Linares dreamed up the creatures, they did not surface in a vacuum. Similarities and parallels can be drawn between alebrijes and various supernatural creatures from Mexico's indigenous and European past. In pre-Hispanic art, the brightly colored images were often fantastic and macabre. Influences from Mexico City's Chinatown, especially in the dragons, and Gothic art such as gargoyles can be seen. Red cardboard demons called judas, which Linares made, are still made to be burned in Mexico during Holy Week in purification rituals. More recent examples in Mexican culture, artist Julio Ruelas and graphics artist/commentator José Guadalupe Posada, have created fantastic and sometimes terrifying images. Alebrijes, especially the monsters, have gained a reputation for "scaring away bad spirits" and protecting the home. Some, like master craftsman Christian David Mendez, claim that there is a certain mysticism involved in the making and owning of alebrijes, with parts of certain animals representing human characteristics.

=== The annual Mexico City Alebrije Parade ===
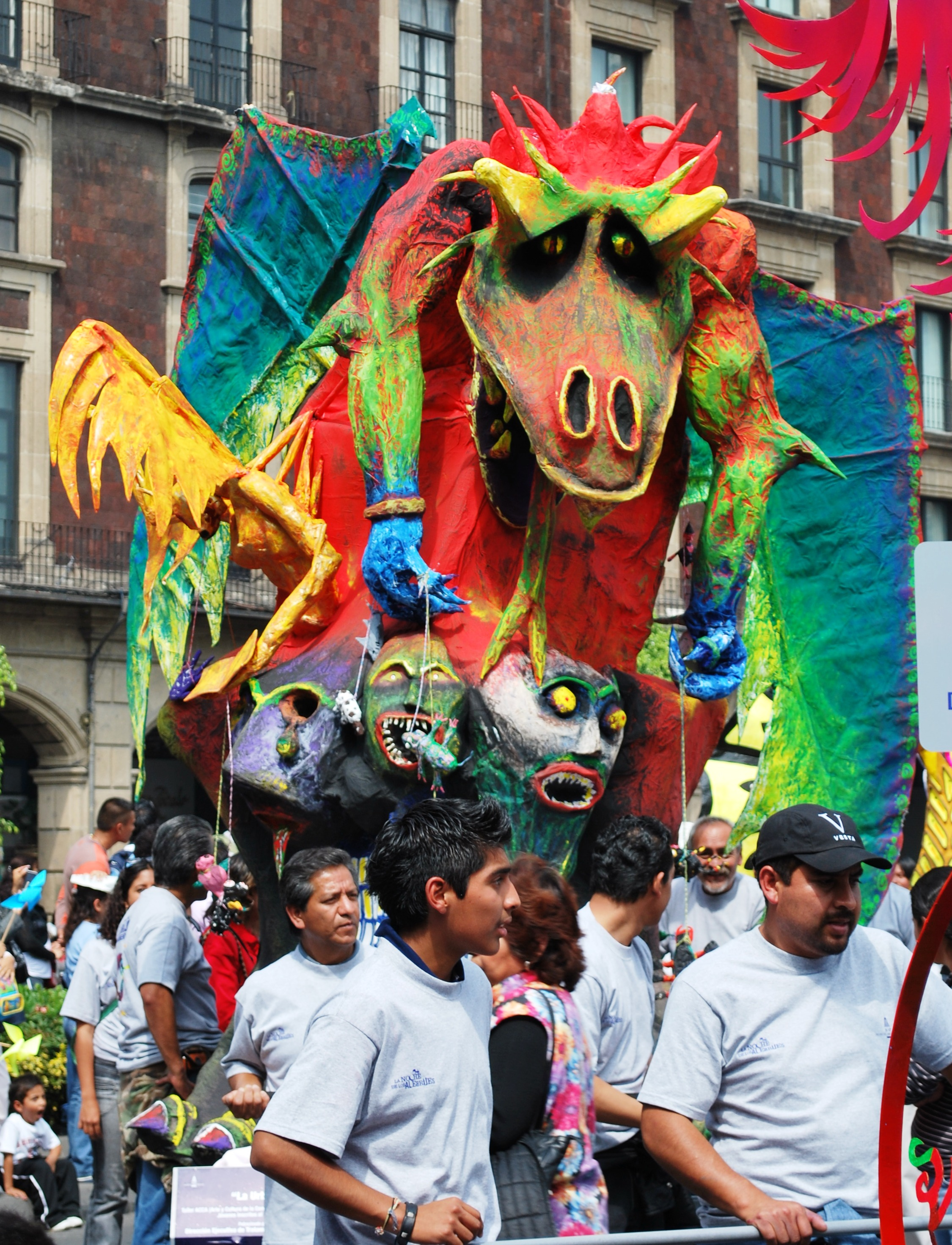
Monumental alebrije named La Urbe in the Zocalo of Mexico City during the 2009 Parade

A more recent phenomenon, the annual Mexico City Alebrije Parade, has been sponsored by the Museo de Arte Popular in Mexico City since 2007. The 2009 parade featured more than 130 giant alebrijes made of wood, cardboard, paper, wire, and other materials, and marched from the Zocalo in the historic center of the city to the Angel of Independence monument on Paseo de la Reforma. Entries by artisans, artists, families and groups each year have gotten bigger, more creative and more numerous, with names like:

- "Devora Stein" by Uriel López Baltazar
- "Alebrhijos" by Santiago Goncen
- "Totolina", by Arte Lado C
- "AH1N1" by Taller Don Guajo
- "Volador", by Taller de Plástica El Volador
- "La mula del 6" by Daniel Martínez Bartelt
- "La gárgola de la Atlántida" by Juan Carlos Islas
- "Alebrije luchador" by Ricardo Rosales

They are accompanied by bands playing popular Mexican music. At the end of the parade, the pieces are lined up on Paseo de la Reforma for judging and displayed for two weeks. The 2010 alebrije parade had themes related to the Bicentennial of the Independence of Mexico and the Centennial of the Mexican Revolution, although Walter Boelsterly, head of the Museo de Artes Populares, concedes that such may require a bit of tolerance because it can lead to revered figures such as Miguel Hidalgo and Ignacio Allende with animal parts. He states that the aim is to celebrate and not to mock. In addition to the annual parade, the Museum has sponsored alebrije shows such as the three-meter tall alebrije which captured attention at the Feria International del Libro in Bogotá. The word "alebrije" was not known in Colombia, so the locals dubbed it a "dragoncito" (little dragon). Along with "dragoncito" 150 other, smaller pieces of Mexican crafts were shown.

== Carved wood alebrijes ==
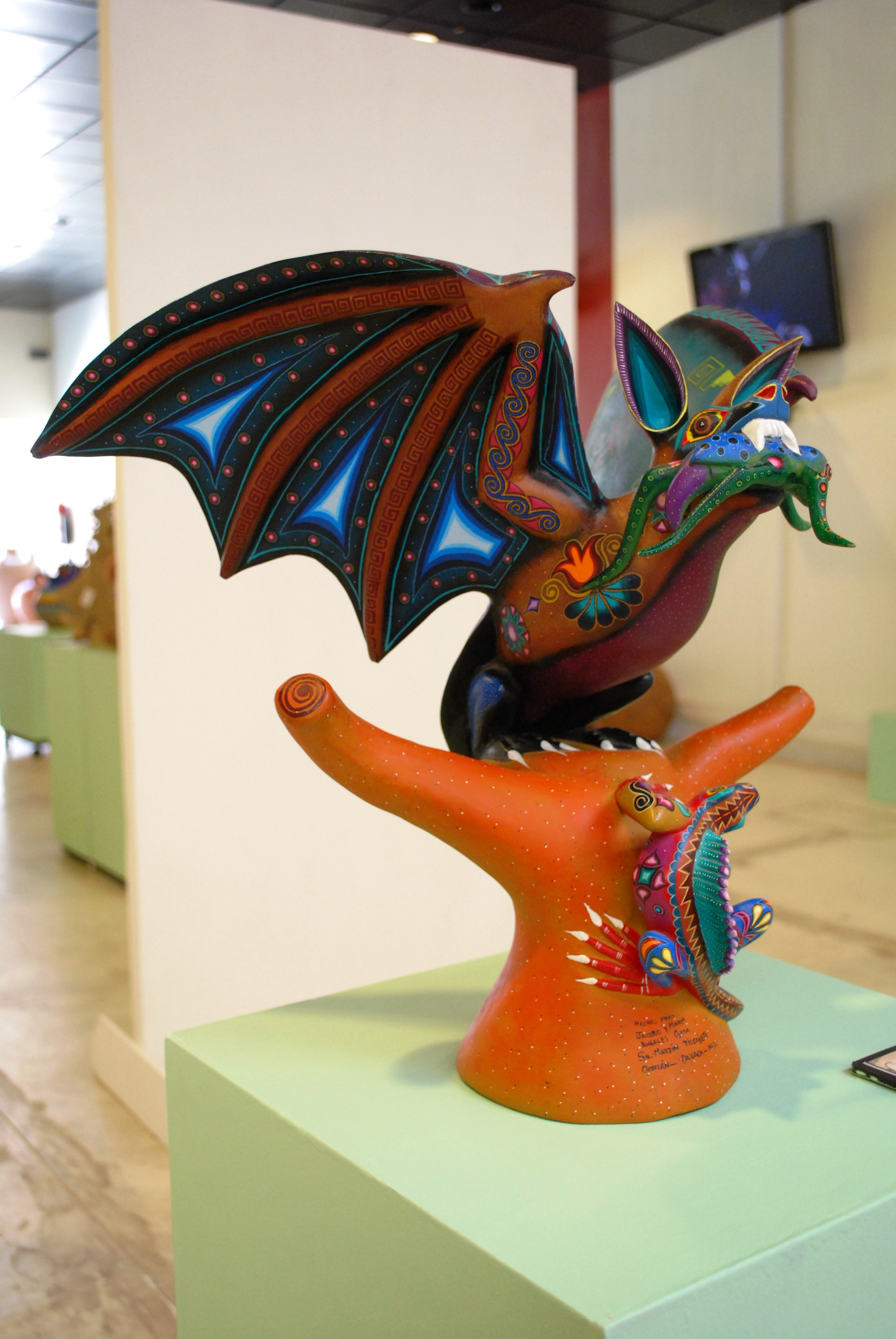
Alebrije El Ciclo de Oaxaca by Jacobo and Maria Angeles on display at the Museo Estatal de Artes Populares de Oaxaca in San Bartolo Coyotepec.

=== Development of the craft in Oaxaca ===
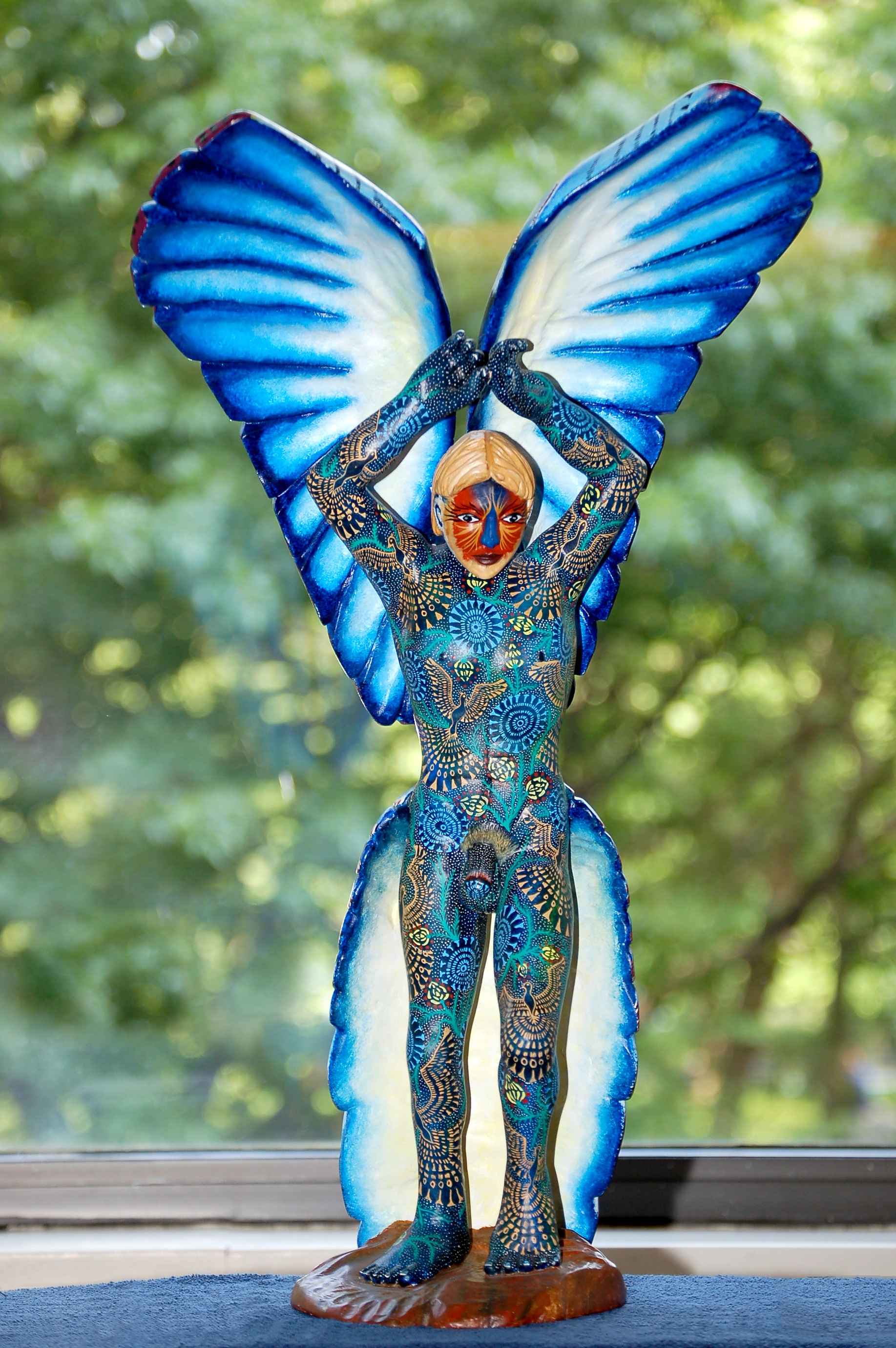
Butterfly man by Francisca Calva of Oaxaca

Many rural households in the Mexican state of Oaxaca have prospered over the past three decades through the sale of brightly painted, whimsical wood carvings they call alebrijes to international tourists and the owners of ethnic arts shops in the United States, Canada, and Europe. What are called "alebrijes" in Oaxaca is a marriage of native woodcarving traditions and influence from Pedro Linares' work in Mexico City.

Pedro Linares was originally from México City (Distrito Federal). In the 1980s, British filmmaker, Judith Bronowski, arranged an itinerant demonstration workshop in the United States participating Pedro Linares, Manuel Jiménez and a textile artisan Maria Sabina from Oaxaca. Although the Oaxaca valley area already had a history of carving animal and other types of figures from wood, it was at this time, when Bronowski's workshop took place when artisans from Oaxaca knew the alebrijes papier-mâché sculptures.

Then Linares' designs were adapted to the carving of a local wood called copal. The Oaxaca valley area already had a history of carving animal and other types of figures from wood, and Linares' designs were adapted to the carving of a local wood called copal. This adaptation was pioneered by Arrazola native Manuel Jiménez. This version of the craft has since spread to a number of other towns, most notably San Martín Tilcajete and La Unión Tejalapan, become a major source of income for the area, especially for Tilcajete. Given the scale of success with alebrijes, populations of native copal trees have decreased over the years. Efforts through reforestation and the management of the trees have yet to create any significant growth in population. The three towns most closely associated with alebrije production in Oaxaca have produced a number of notable artisans such as Manuel Jiménez, Jacobo Angeles, Martin Sandiego, Julia Fuentes and Miguel Sandiego.

One of the most important things about the fantastical creatures carved of wood is that every piece is removable, it is how one can tell a genuine piece carved by one of the original great carvers. The later carvers did not learn the technique of making each piece fit so well that it could be removed and put back in again and again. Those pieces have more than tripled in value. The painting on these figures is also more intense and varied. The first to copy the fantastic forms and bright colors was Manuel Jiménez, who carved the figures in local copal wood rather than using paper. Animal figures had always been carved in the central valleys area of Oaxaca by the Zapotecs since the pre-Hispanic period. Totems of local animals were carved for luck or religious purposes as well as hunting decoys. Figures were also carved for children as toys, a tradition that continued well into the 20th century.

After the craft became popular in Arrazola, it spread to Tilcajete and from there to a number of other communities, and now the three main communities are, San Antonino Arrazola, San Martin Tilcajete and La Union Tejalapam, each of which has developed its own style. The carving of wood figures did not have a name, so the name "alebrije" eventually became adopted for any carved, brightly colored figure of copal wood, whether it is of a real animal or not. To make the distinction, the carvings of fantastic creatures, closer to Linares' alebrijes, are now sometimes called "marcianos" (lit. Martians). Oaxacan alebrijes have eclipsed the Mexico City version, with a large number of stores in and around the city of Oaxaca selling the pieces, and it is estimated that more than 150 families in the same area make a living making the figures.

Woodcarving, along with other crafts in Oaxaca, grew in importance as the state opened up to tourism. This started in the 1940s with the Pan-American Highway and has continued to this day with the construction of more roads, airports and other transportation coincided with the rising prosperity of the U.S. and Canada making Mexico an affordable exotic vacation. Oaxacan woodcarving began to be bought in the 1960s by hippies. Prior to the 1980s, most of the woodcarvings were natural and spiritual world of the communities, featuring farm animals, farmers, angels and the like. These pieces, now referred to as "rustic" (nistico), were carved and painted in a simple manner. Later known for their alebrijes, carvers such as Manuel Jimenez of Arrazola, Isadoro Cruz of Tilcajete and Martin Sandiego of La Union began by carving animals as youths, often while doing other chores such as tending sheep. By the 1960s and 1970s, these carvers had enough of a reputation to sell their work in the city of Oaxaca. As more dealers shipping to other parts of Mexico and abroad visited the rural villages, more exotic animals such as lions, elephants and the like were added, and eventually came to dominate the trade. Eventually, traditional paints gave way to acrylics as well. Another development that encouraged woodcarving were artisans' contests held by the state of Oaxaca in the 1970s, which encouraged carvers to try new ideas in order to win prizes and sell their pieces to state museums.

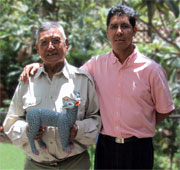
Manuel Jimenez with one of his creations

In the 1970s and early 1980s, carvers in the three villages sold pieces mostly to store owners in Oaxaca, with only one carver, Manuel Jimenez, carving full-time. Most other carvers used the craft to supplement incomes from farming and wage labor. It was also considered to be a male occupation. In the mid-1980s, the influence of the Linares alebrijes was becoming popular and wholesalers and store owners from the United States, began to deal with artisans in Oaxaca directly. The desire of the foreign merchants for non-indigenous animals and the newly popular alebrijes affected the market. By 1990, woodcarving had begun to boom with most households in Arrazola and Tilcajete earning at least part of their income from the craft. La Union was less successful in attracting dealers and tourists. The boom had a dramatic economic effect, shifting the economies of Arrazola and Tilcajete away from farming and towards carving. It also affected the carvings that were being produced. Carvings became more complicated and paintings more ornate as families competed against each other. Specialization also occurred with neophyte carvers looking for a niche to compete with already established carvers. The craft continued to become established in the 1990s as more families carved and more tourists came to Oaxaca with the building of new roads. Some of these new Oaxacan crafters have extended the design to smooth – abstract painted realistic animals, especially the Mendoza family (Luis Pablo, David Pablo and Moises Pablo a.k.a. Ariel Playas), creating a new generation of alebrijes.

While the sales trend has been mostly positive for Oaxacan alebrijes, it is dependent on global market fluctuations and on tourism to Oaxaca. There was a decline in sales in the late 1980s, possibly due to global market saturation and the dominance of repetitive, unimaginative designs. Sales rose again in the 1990s. Sales fell again in 2001, when tourism from the U.S. fell and fell again precipitously in 2006 due to statewide social unrest. It has not fully recovered since.

The alebrije market is divided into two levels, the production of unique, high-quality, labor-intensive pieces and the production of repetitive, average quality and inexpensive pieces. Those who have produced exceptionally fine pieces have gained reputations as artists, commanding high prices. Larger pieces are generally made only by the better carving families. While pieces can be bought and ordered from the artisans directly, most sell to middlemen who in turn sell them to outlets in Mexico and abroad. The most successful carving families sell almost exclusively to dealers and may have only a few pieces available for the drop-in visitor. Within Mexico, Oaxacan alebrijes are often sold in tourist locations such as Oaxaca city, La Paz, Cancún, Cozumel and Puerto Escondido. Most pieces sold internationally go to the United States, Canada, Europe and Japan, where the most expensive pieces end up in ethnic craft stores in urban areas, university towns and upscale resorts. Cheaper pieces tend to be sold at trade shows and gift shops. Tourists who buy pieces directly from carvers pay about twice what wholesalers do.

The price of each piece depends on the quality, coloring, size, originality and sometimes the reputation of the carver. The most expensive pieces are most often sent abroad. Pieces sold retail in Oaxaca generally range from US$1 to $200. The most commercialized figures are those of dogs, armadillos, iguanas, giraffes, cats, elephants, zebras, deer, dolphins, sharks, and fish. Animals are often painted with bright colors and designs and carved with exaggerated features that bear little resemblance to what occurs in the natural world. Anthropomorphism is common and carvings of animals playing musical instruments, golfing, fishing, and engaging in other human pursuits are very popular.

Fantastic creatures such as dragons and chimeras and others are also carved, even carvings of Benito Juárez, Subcomandante Marcos, chupacabras (imaginary beings that eat goats), "Martians," mermaids, and hippocampus.

The diversity of the figures is due to a segmented market both in Mexico and abroad which rewards novelty and specialization. In a number of cases, carvings return to images from Mexican culture such as angels, saints, and Virgins, which will have somber faces even if they are painted in very bright colors. Devils and skeletons are often parts of more festive scenes depicting them, for example, riding dogs and drinking. Foreign customers demand more creative figures with little repetition. Prices abroad range from between three and five times the retail price in Oaxaca, with a median of US$100, with lowest usually around $10 and highest around $2,000. One of the most expensive pieces sold from a carving village occurred in 1995, when a doctor from Mexico City paid Isidro Cruz of Tilcajete the equivalent of US$3000 for a piece entitled "Carousel of the Americas." This piece took Cruz three months to complete.

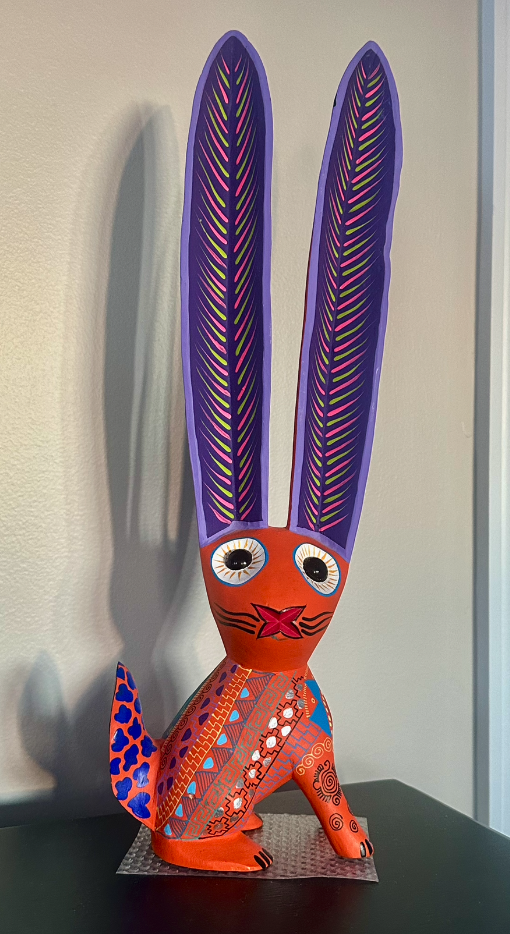
Contemporary Mexican Alebrije

Typical household income of families from Arrazola and Tilcajete averages about US$2000 per year, but exceptional artists can earn up to $20,000 per year. Two thousand a year is substantially more than average in Oaxaca and allows families to build or expand housing and send children to secondary school. Most families carve as a sideline with agriculture providing basic staples. In some towns, especially in Tilcajete, the economy has shifted from agriculture to the making of wood carvings with a number of families abandoning farming altogether. For most households in Oaxaca, the success of alebrijes has not replaced the need to farm or alleviated the need to send family members to Mexico City or to the United States and work and send remittances back home.

Despite Oaxaca's reputation for the production of crafts by indigenous peoples, alebrije makers are monolingual Spanish speakers who generally do not identify themselves as a member of an indigenous group, though almost all have Zapotec ancestors. The alebrijes are considered to be novelty items for the makers rather than expressions of a cultural heritage. More traditional woodcarving, such as utensils, toys, religious figures and the like are still made by older residents, but these crafts are overshadowed by alebrijes. Approximately 150 families now devote themselves at least part-time to the making of alebrijes, with carving techniques being passed down from generation to generation and many children growing up around fantastic figures both finished and in process.

Due to copies from other places, a certification scheme is being considered to ensure the viability of crafts from this area. That would include educating consumers and working with reputable stores.

=== The carving process ===
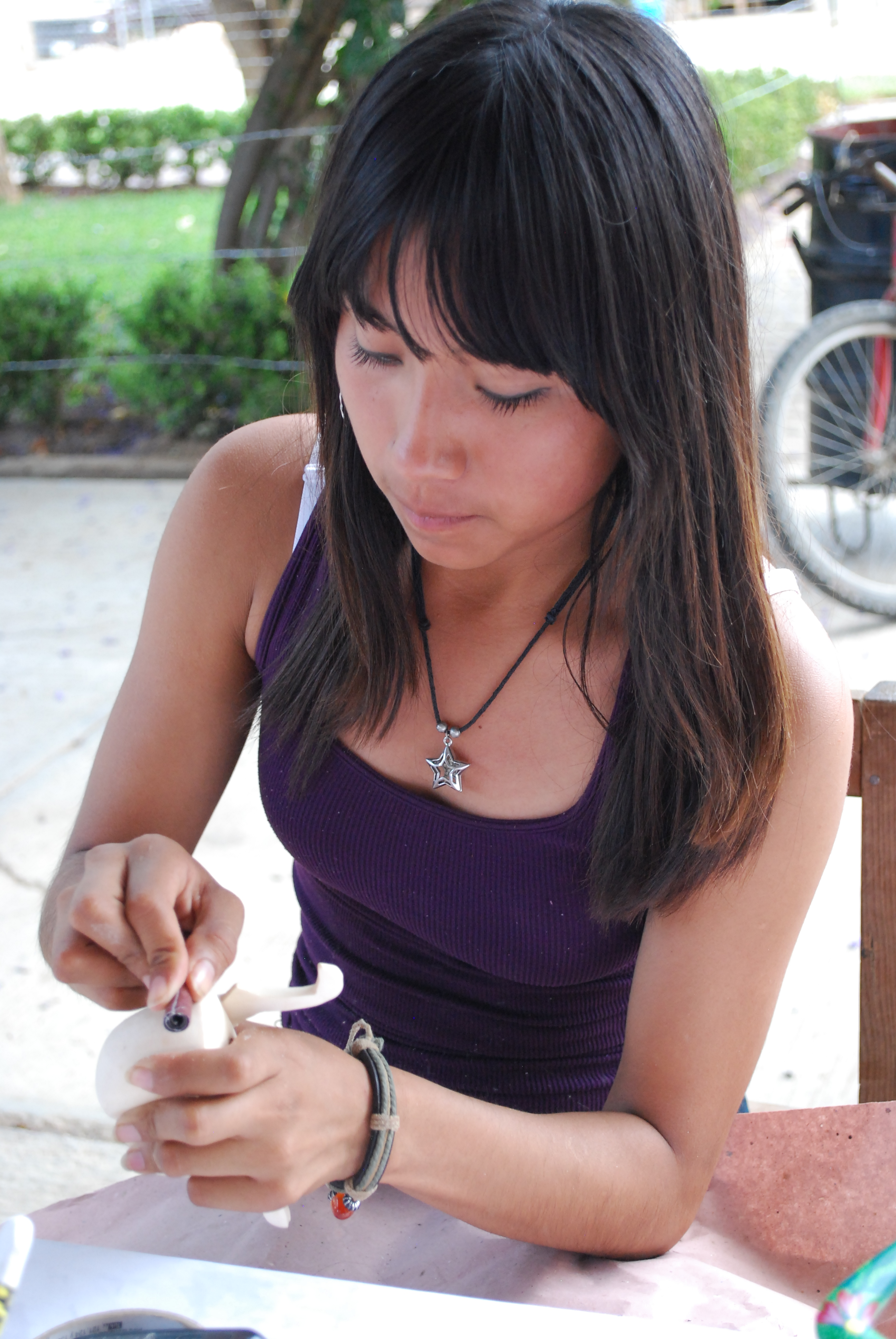
Woman sanding an alebrije in progress in San Martin Tilcajete

The carving of a piece, which is done while the wood is still wet, can last anywhere from hours to a month, depending on the size and fineness of the piece. Often the copal wood that is used will influence what is made, both because of the shapes the branches can take and because male and female trees differ in hardness and shape. Carving is done with non-mechanical hand tools such as machetes, chisels and knives. The only time a more sophisticated tool is used is when a chain saw is employed to cut off a branch or level a base for the proposed figure. The basic shape of the creature is usually hacked using a machete, then a series of smaller knives used as the final shape is achieved. Certain details such as ears, tails and wings are usually made from pieces separate from the one for the main body.

After the carving, the figure is then left to dry for up to ten months, depending on its overall size and thickness. Semi tropical wood such as copal is susceptible to insect infestations, and for this reason drying pieces are often soaked in gasoline and sometimes baked to ensure that all insect eggs have been destroyed. As the figure dries, it is also susceptible to cracking. The cracks are filled with small pieces of copal wood and a sawdust resin mixture before painting.

Oaxaca woodcarvings were all originally painted with aniline paints made with natural ingredients such as bark of the copal tree, baking soda, lime juice, pomegranate seeds, zinc, indigo, huitlacoche and cochineal. These colorings were also used for dying clothing, ceremonial paints and other uses. Since 1985, most carvers have now switched to acrylics which resist fading and withstand repeated cleanings better. Some still use aniline paints as they have a more rustic look that some customers prefer. Either way, the painting is generally done in two layers, with a solid undercoat and a multicolored designed superimposed.

Originally, woodcarving was a solitary activity with all aspects done by one person, usually a male. As sales soared in the 1980s, the work began to be shared among family members. Women and children help mostly with sanding and painting, leaving men to contribute less than half of the work that goes into the figures. Despite this, pieces are still referred to as the work of one person, usually the male carver. There are exceptions to this. There are men who paint better than they carve and in the community of San Pedro Taviche, women collect and carve wood about as often as the men. In most cases, all the work on pieces is done by family members. Families may hire other relatives or strangers if faced with a large order. However, only the most established of carving families can have any permanent outside help and a number of these refuse to hire outsiders.

=== Copal wood ===
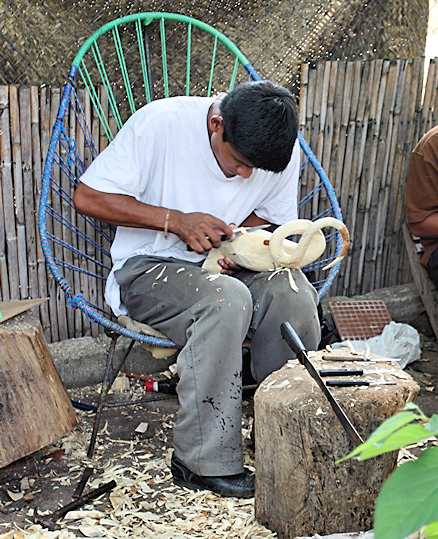
An alebrije being carved from Copal wood in Arrazola.

Almost all alebrije carvers in Oaxaca use the wood of trees from the genus Bursera (Family Burseraceae), with a preference for the species B. glabrifolia, which is locally called copalle or copalillo. This tree is typically found in dry tropical forests in Oaxaca and neighboring states. The exceptions are Isidro Cruz of Tilcajete, who uses "zompantle" (Erythrina coralloides) and the Manuel Jimenez family, which carves in tropical cedar (Cedrela odorata) imported from Guatemala.

Originally, carvers obtained wood from the local forests on their own. Copal trees are short and squat and do not yield much wood; every piece is used. Despite this, the success of woodcarving caused an unsustainable drain on local wild copal, and nearly all of the trees near Tilcajete and Arrazola have disappeared. This localized depletion soon gave rise to a copal wood market in Oaxaca, even though many of the copal trees in other parts are of a different subspecies, which has more knots. Obtaining wood is a complex exercise because negotiating with other municipalities requires navigating complex social, legal and economic norms, and in many cases, state and federal environmental authorities have stepped in to try to preserve wild copal trees in a number of areas. Some communities have simply refused to sell their wood. These difficulties has led to a black market in copal wood, with carvers purchasing most of their supplies from vendors called "copaleros". Harvesting copalillo is not a complex task; trees are relatively small and the wood is soft. Trees are felled using an axe or chainsaw. Branches are cut with machetes. Most harvesting occurs on ejidal (communal) lands. Legal or not, the purchase of copal wood from other parts of Oaxaca is putting unsustainable pressure on wild populations in a wider area, forcing copaleros to go further to obtain wood and often to deal with angry locals and police who alternately seek bribes and enforce the law. Eventually, this led to about only six copaleros which control most of the wood being sold, and these supplies' being unreliable. The federal government states that most of the figures are made with illegally obtained wood.

Securing supplies of copal wood is a major concern for woodcarvers. Despite the fact that the cost of the wood is not particularly high, despite the effort, the main issue is reliability. Another issue for carvers is quality. Artisans will pay more for their wood only if they are sure they can pass the added cost onto their customers. A number of attempts to grow the trees for woodcarving purpose have been undertaken. Copal is a native tree species to the area, so it grows readily without much care. It takes anywhere from five to ten years for a tree to grow big enough to be harvested (branches or entire tree). Some of the efforts include reforestation efforts sponsored by groups such as the Rodolfo Morales Foundation in Ocotlan, and a number of families spend time planting trees during the rainy season. Some have begun copal plantations. Various artisans have also joined the reforestation efforts through associations of their own, creating alebrijes while attempting to restore what they take from nature. Current needs for the wood far outweigh what these efforts have been able to produce.

Another effort involves a program designed to manage wild copal supplies in a municipality called San Juan Bautista Jayacatlán. This arrangement has economic advantages for both the alebrije-makers and the owners of the forests where the wood is produced. It has not been developed sufficiently yet to affect the illegal harvest of wood, but its organizers hope that in time, it will become the more economical and preferred method. The difference between this program and others is that this works within the broader ethnobotanical context by promoting the management of the species within its native habitat. Jayacatlán is located next to the recently established biosphere reserve of Tehuacán-Cuicatlán. The benefit to Jayacatlán is to give the municipality a way to exploit its copal supplies and preserve its biodiversity at the same time. The benefit to carvers is to promote a reliable source of wood, as well as a trademark called "ecoalebrijes" to help them sell more alebrijes at a higher price. The wood from Jayacatlan is only sold to Arrazola and not to the other major center of Tilcajete. The enthusiasm of Arrazola's woodcarvers stems more from having a supply of good wood than from notions of ecology.

=== San Martin Tilcajete ===
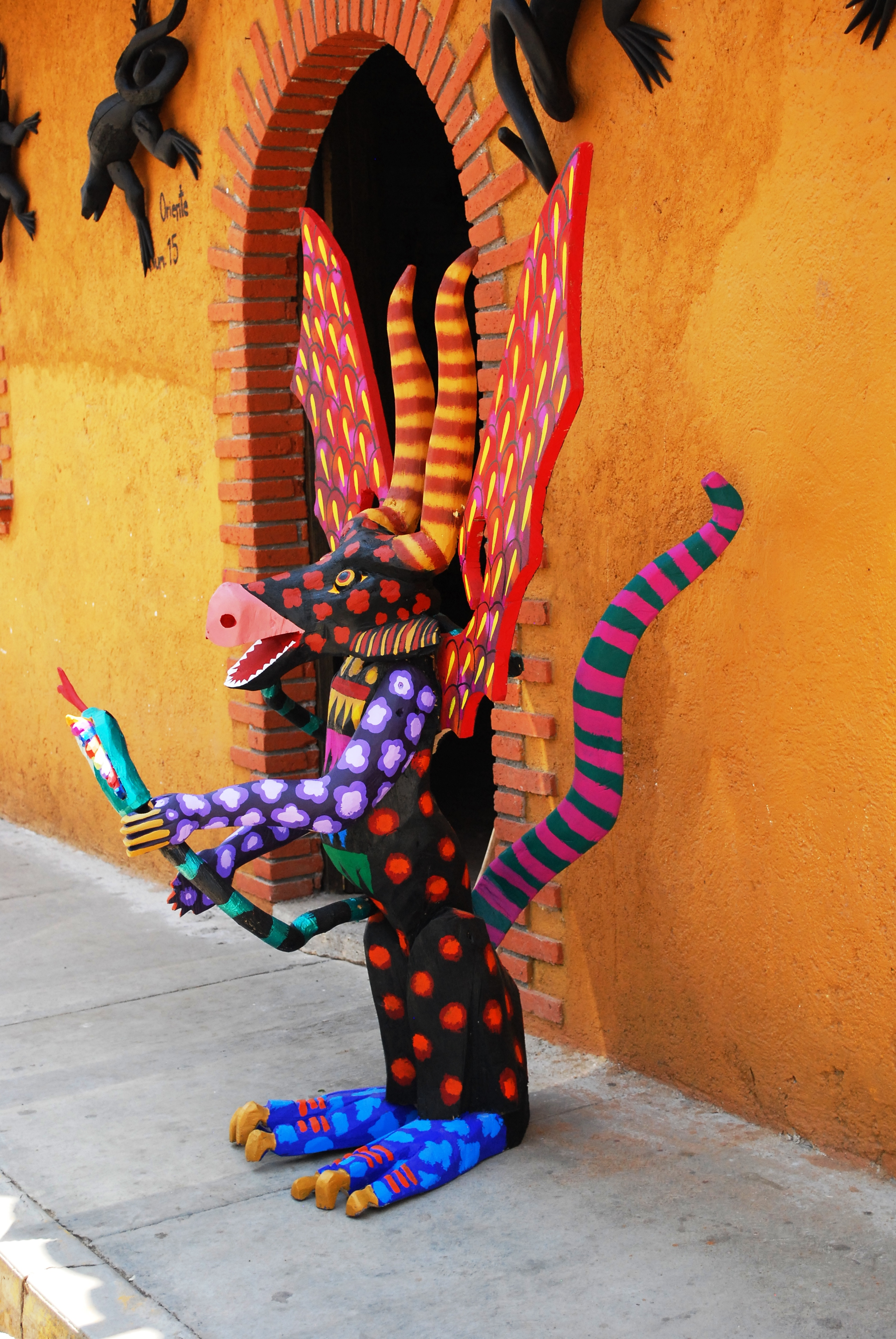
Large alebrije outside a shop in San Martin Tilcajete

Of the three major carving towns, San Martin Tilcajete has experienced the most success. This success is mostly due to carver Isidro Cruz, who learned to carve when he was thirteen during a long illness in the late 1940s. His work was sold locally and eventually noticed by Tonatiúh Gutierrez, the director of expositions for the Mexican National Tourist Council, later a government agency in charge of promoting crafts. He encouraged Cruz to carve masks and later appointed him in charge of a state craft buying center. Cruz worked at this for four years, learning much about craft selling and getting others from Tilcajete connected to the market. Unlike other carvers, Cruz was open about his techniques and by the late 1970s, about ten men were carving and selling in Tilcajete. Cruz not only taught his methods to others, he was able to purchase many of his neighbors' works. Cruz's efforts stimulated new styles of carving, such as alebrijes, and their sale in the city of Oaxaca. By the 1980s, there were four families devoted to carving full-time, with the rest splitting their time between crafts and agriculture. Through the 1960s and to the 1980s, embroidered shirts, blouses and dresses were still a well-received craft from Tilcajete, but by the end of the 1980s, most families were involved in carving alebrijes.

Today, the carving of alebrijes is the economic base of Tilcajete. Every Friday on the main square is the "tianguis del alebrije" or weekly market selling wooden figures. The event allows visitors to purchase items from local craftsmen directly. There are usually also vendors selling other local products such as ice cream as well. Annually, the municipality holds its Feria del Alebrije (Alebrije Festival), which features alebrije sales and exhibitions, music, dance and theatre. There are also offerings of local and regional cuisine. More than 100 vendors attend, selling alebrijes, textiles, local dishes, artwork and locally made alcoholic beverages. It is sponsored by the Master Craftsmen Group of Tilcajete (Grupo de Maestros Talladoes de Tilcajete), which includes Hedilberto Olivera, Emilia Calvo, Roberta Ángeles, Juventino Melchor, Martin Melchor, Margarito Melchor Fuentes, Margarito Melchor Santiago, José Olivera Pérez, Jesús Melchor García, Inocente Vásquez, María Jiménez, Cira Ojeda, Jacobo and María Ángeles, Justo Xuana, Victor Xuana, Rene Xuana, Abad Xuana, Flor and Ana Xuana, Rogelio Alonso, who works in papier-mâché, and Doris Arellano, who is a painter.

Some of the better known artisans in Tilcajete include Delfino Gutierrez, sisters Ana and Marta Bricia Hernandez, the family of Efrain and Silvia Fuentes, Coindo Melchor, Margarito Melchor and Maria Jimenez. Delfino Gutierrez specializes in free-form elephants, frogs, turtles, armadillos and more which are sold in stores in Chicago, California, New York and Israel. The Hernandez sisters sell primarily from their home and known for their painting style. The Fuentes family gained fame from Efrain's carving talents. He was featured in an exhibit in Santa Fe, NM when he was only 13 and his work has been featured in at least one book. Margarito Melchor specializes in cats, and Coindo Melchor carves elaborate ox teams with bulls, driver, and a cart filled with animals and crops as well as creatures that have been described as "bird headed women." Maria Jimenez and her brothers specialize in saints and angels as well as some animals. Maria is the best known painter in the Oaxacan community. She says that she has about thirty designs that she has developed for carvings, many of which are related to when she made embroidered dresses.

The most successful artisan is Jacobo Angeles, whose work have been prominently displayed at The Smithsonian and the National Museum of Mexican Art in Chicago. It can also be found in numerous museums, art colleges and galleries in the world. Jacobo learned to carve from his father when he was twelve, and later was mentored by elders in his and other communities. While alebrijes designs have been innovative and incorporating modern elements, the Angeles family's designs focus on representations of Zapotec culture. This can be seen in the painted designs, based on influences such as the friezes of Mitla, and other ancient symbols as well as the continued use in aniline paints made from natural ingredients such as the bark of the copal tree, baking soda, lime juice, pomegranate seeds, zinc, indigo, huitlacoche and cochineal. Each year, Jacobo travels the United States to promote Oaxacan folk art in general to educational institution as well as a speaker at art institutions.

=== Arrazola ===
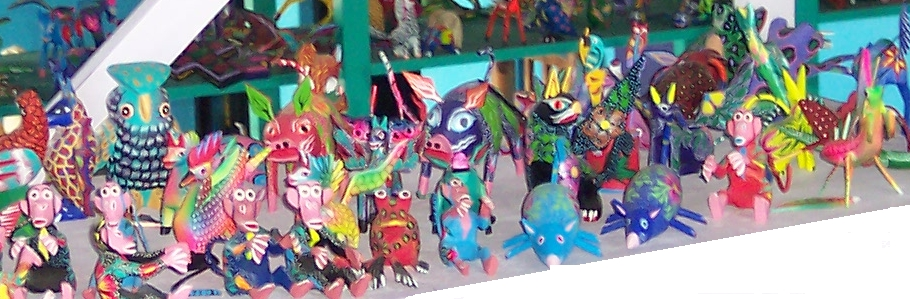
Alebrijes for sale in Arrazola

The making of alebrijes in Oaxaca was initially established in Arrazola by Manuel Jimenez. Jimenez began carving wooden figures since he was a boy tending animals in the 1920s. By the late 1950s and early 1960s, Jimenez's work was being sold in the city of Oaxaca, which led them to being shown to folk art collectors such as Nelson Rockefeller. By the late 1960s, he was giving exhibitions in museums in Mexico City and the United States and tourists began visiting his workshop in the 1970s. He kept his carving techniques strictly within the family with only his sons and a son in law carving with him. For this reason, only six families were carving alebrijes in Arrazola as late as 1985. Jimenez died in 2005. Today, Jimenez's works fetch a minimum of US$100.

Many carvers and carving communities engage in specialties in order to have niches in the more competitive alebrije market in Oaxaca. In Arrazola, one of the community's specialty is the carving of complex animal bodies, especially iguanas out of one single piece of wood. Another way the community competes is through its annual festival "Cuna de los Alebrijes" (Cradle of the Alebrijes), which is held each year to promote its figures. This fair is cosponsored by the Secretary of Tourism for the state of Oaxaca. It occurs in the second half of December, during the Christmas season, with more than sixty artisans who make the figures. The goals are to draw more tourists to the town at this time and to make connections with stores, galleries and museums.

Like Tilcajete, Arrazola has a number of well known artisans. Marcelo Hernandez Vasquez and his sisters have been making alebrijes for eighteen years, and Juan Carlos Santiago is sought out for his penguins. Antonio Aragon makes small, finely carved, realistic deer, dogs, lions and cats, and Sergio Aragon specializes in miniatures.

One of the best known is Miguel Santiago, who sells about forty pieces a year. Some of these sales are individual pieces and others are multiple sets such as Frida Kalo surrounded by monkeys. Sets are usually sold to foreign buyers for between US$300 and $800 and have been sent to Europe, Japan and the United States. Sets often take more than a month to make and his work is considered to be in the high end of the market. Santiago's orders extend more than two years in advance. Santiago used to work with a brother and later with a nephew, but today he works mostly solo with his father to help. Another of the best known is one of the few female entrepreneurs in the market, Olga Santiago. She does not carve or paint, rather she hires others to do the work while she administrates. However, she signs all the pieces. Many of her carvers and painters are young men who leave quickly to form workshops of their own. While her workshop is not the only one run in this manner, hers is the newest and most successful. Olga's client base is tourists, which are often brought to her by tour guides, taxi drivers and the like for a commission, and wholesalers.

=== La Unión Tejalapan ===
La Union Tejalapan has not had the same success as Arrazola and Tilcajete because they have not been able to attract as many dealers or tourists. A significant market remains for simple rustic pieces (pre-alebrije) and pieces painted with traditional aniline paints, which La Union specializes in. These are popular with those seeking non alebrije pieces such as saints, angels, devils, skeletons and motifs related to Day of the Dead. Alebrije pieces are also made, but are painted simply with one or two colors with few decorations. La Union artisans make multipiece rodeos, fiestas, and nativity scenes. Another rustic aspect to La Union pieces is that legs can be nailed onto the torsos. The first alebrije carver from La union was Martin Santiago. In the 1950s and 1960s, Santiago worked in the United States for various periods working as an agricultural laborer in the Bracero Program. When this program ended, Santiago found that he could not support his family by farming and began selling woodcarvings to a shop owner in Oaxaca. This arrangement ended after a complex dispute. Santiago then began carving and selling on his own with his four brothers and for many years the Santiago family was the only carvers in the community.

Today there are a number of others involved in the craft. Aguilino Garcia sells fairly expensive skunks, crocodiles, armadillos, and palm trees. He has a reputation for working slowing but makes pieces that were selling for between 100 and 400 pesos in 1998. Better known is the husband and wife team of Reynaldo Santiago and Elodia Reyes, who have been carving since their marriage in the mid-1970s. Reynaldo is a nephew of Martin Santiago. Like in many other carving families, he carves while she paints. Their children are not involved in their business. While the couple make some large and medium-sized pieces, they specialize in miniatures (around seven cm), such as dogs, cats, giraffes, rabbits and goats which will for around 30 pesos each. Because La Union gets few tourists, the couple is mostly reliant on the store owners and wholesalers who buy from them. Today their major buyers are a wholesaler in California and a store owner in Texas.

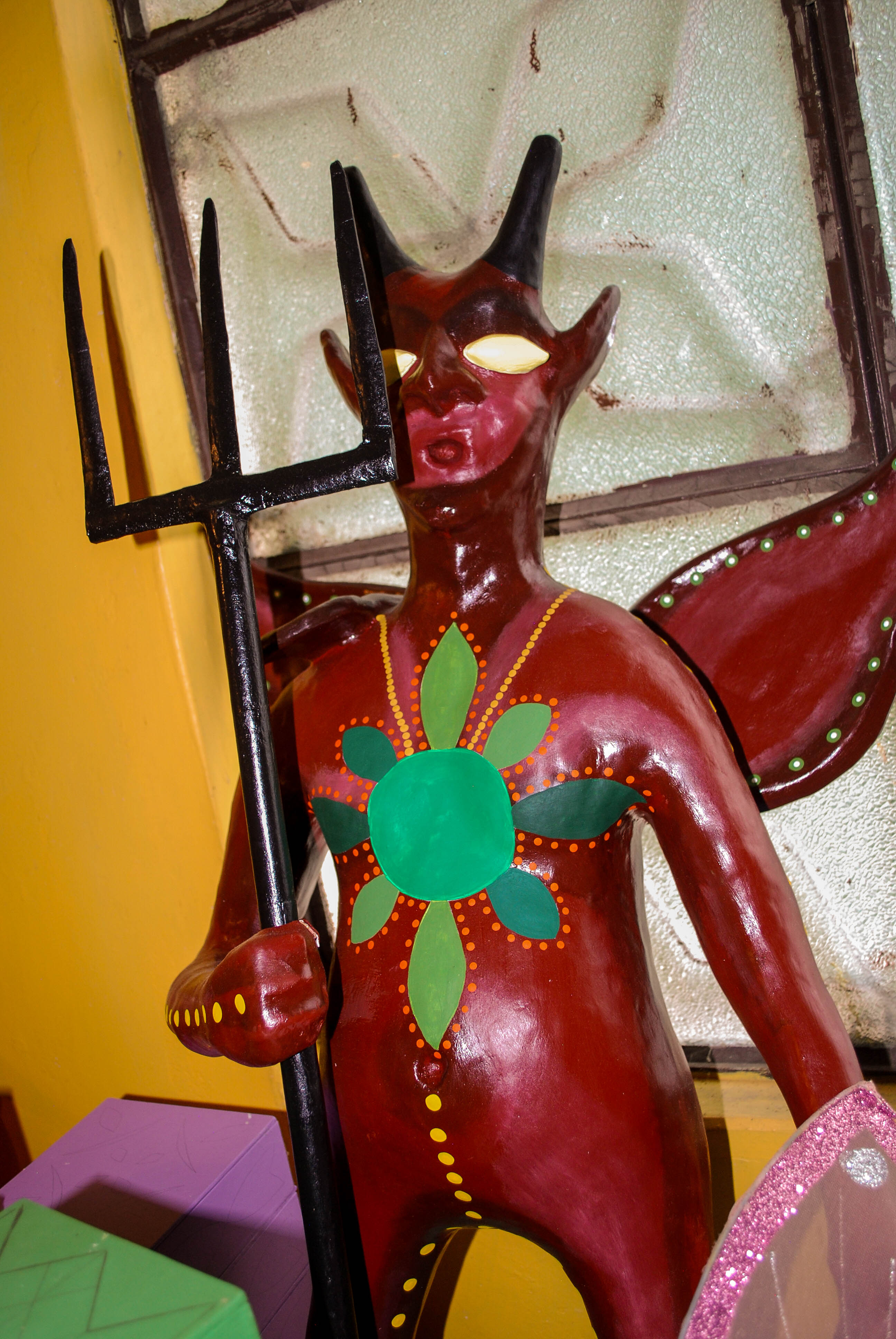
Zacualpan Mojiganga 019

== Other parts of Mexico ==
Outside of Mexico City and Oaxaca, alebrijes are known and made but mostly as a hobby rather than as a significant source of work. Most of these alebrijes are made with papier-mâché, wire, cardboard and sometimes with other materials such as cloth. Alebrije workshops and exhibitions have been held in Cancún. Workshops on the making of alebrijes with the purpose of selling them have been held in Cuautla, Morelos. In Tampico, workshops are given by Omar Villanueva. He has also given workshops in Nuevo Laredo, Campeche, Cancun, Playa del Carmen, Chetumal, Querétero and other places.

One alebrije craftsman in Cuautla is Marcos Zenteno, who has taught the craft to his daughter. He also gives workshops on the making of the craft to others. One of the major attractions at the Primer Festival Internacional de las Artes in Saltillo in 2000 were alebrijes, which came from workshops from Monclova, Sabinas, Parras de la Fuente and Saltillo.

== Illuminated alebrijes ==
Lighted alebrije figures on display at the Museo de Arte Popular in Mexico City

An innovation in alebrijes are versions which are lighted, generally designed to be carried by a single person on the shoulders. Instead of cartonería, these alebrijes are made on movable metal frames, with LED lights, and with cloth or plastic skin. Preferred materials for the structure include ecological fabrics and micro-papers, assembled together before the alebrijes are fully painted and varnished for exhibition.

This style of alebrije was first presented at a short parade dedicated to them in 2014 in Colonia Roma. These versions have been made in Mexico City by various artists, especially in workshops such as the Fábrica de Artes y Oficios Oriente. Exhibitions dedicated to the variation have attracted up to 6,000 people to the Museo de Arte Popular in Mexico City and have been displayed at Mexico International Festival of Lights.

== See also ==
- Mexico City Alebrije Parade
- El Tigre: The Adventures of Manny Rivera - One of the villains is an Alebrije Monster.
- Coco - Countless alebrijes inhabit the land of the dead, some as spirit guides
- El Alebrije, Mexican luchador enmascarado based on an Alebrije entity
- Leyendas (franchise) Alebrije and Evaristo are the main characters.
- Guacamelee!, a gigantic hostile alebrije is encountered in this video game
- Dead Man's Party, an album by Oingo Boingo with a tableau of alebrijes at a wedding party featured on the cover.
