= Mexico City Alebrije Parade =

Annual event in Mexico City

Coordinates: 19°25′57.73″N 99°8′0.06″W

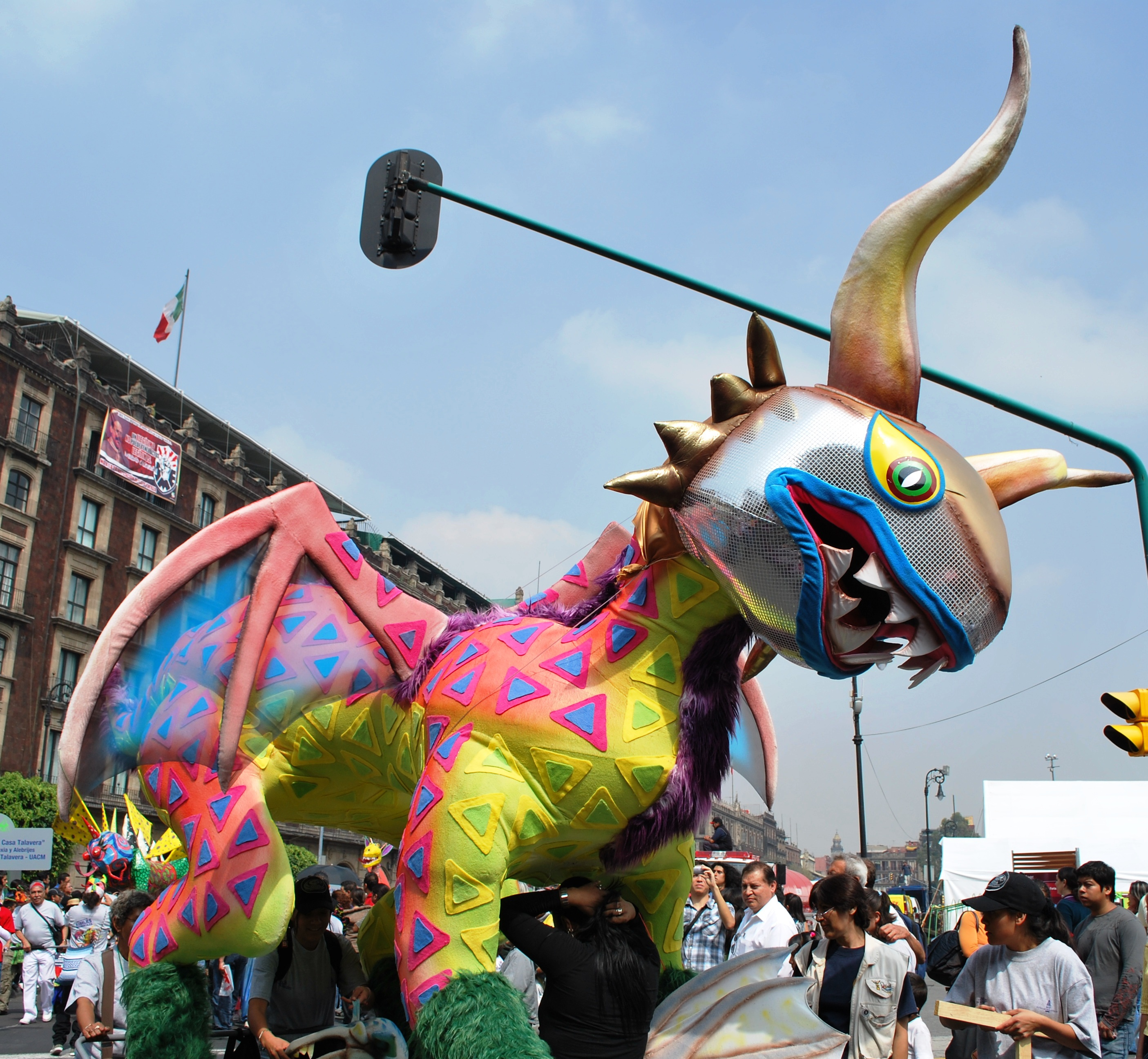
Alebrije named Alebrije Luchador at the 2009 event in the Zocalo

The Mexico City Alebrije Parade is an annual event to honor Mexican handcrafts and folk art, especially a hard kind of papier-mâché called “cartonería” and the creation of fantastic figures with it called “alebrijes.” Alebrijes are chimera-like creatures credited to artisan Pedro Linares painted in bright colors. The alebrijes for the parade are larger than anything Linares created, up to four meters in height and three meters in width. The parade begins on midday on a Saturday in late October in the historic center of Mexico City. The giant creatures are accompanied by musicians, clowns, people in costume and more, giving the event a Carnival-like atmosphere. After the parade the creations are judged with prizes awarded. There are also related literary and musical compositions.

== Event ==
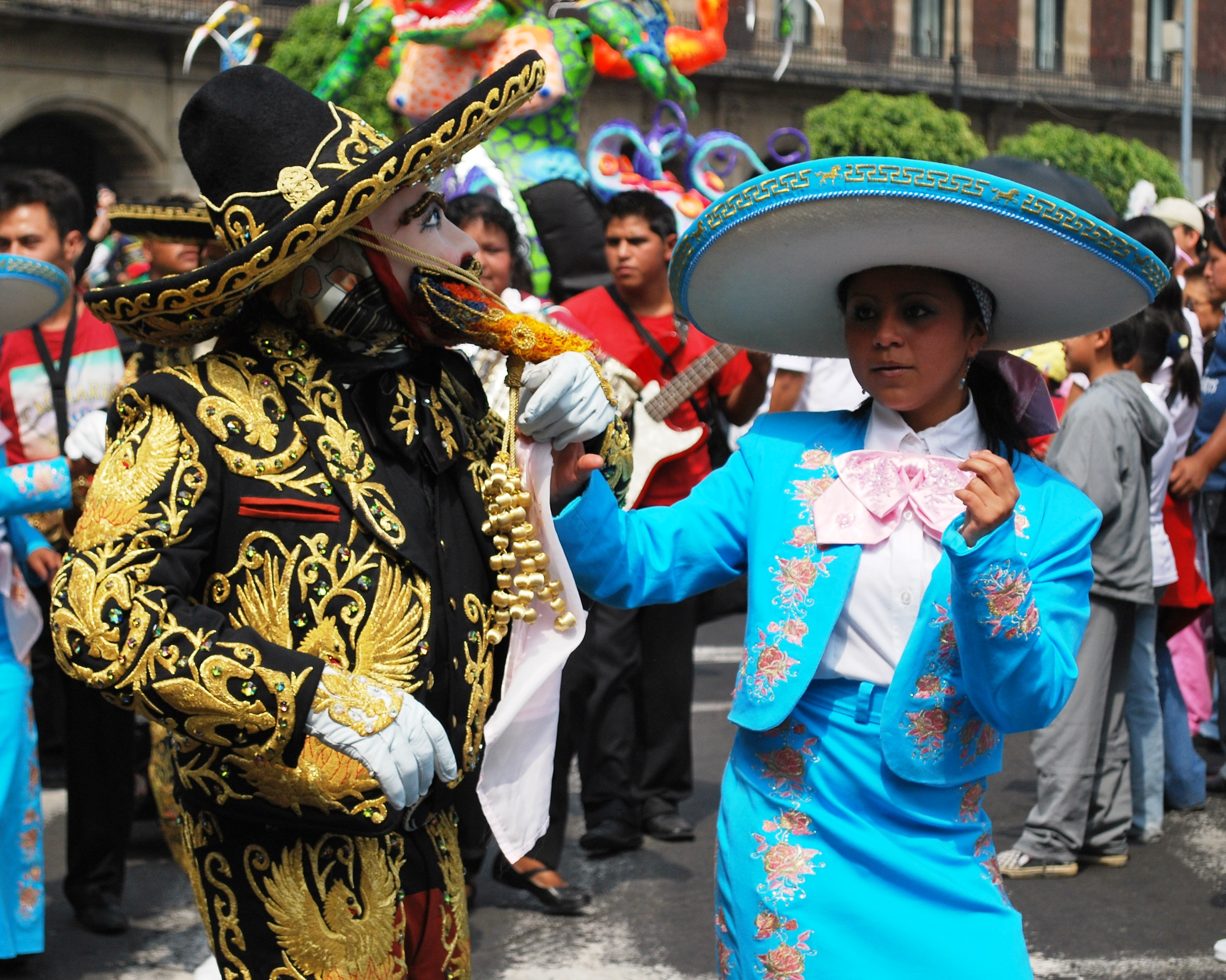
Folk dance group "Aguas Vivas" at the 2009 parade

The event is alternatively known as La Noche de los Alebrijes (Night of the Alebrijes), and the Desfile y Concurso de Alebrijes Monumentales del MAP (Monumental Alebrije Parade and Contest of MAP). The parade and contest is organized by the Museo de Arte Popular, in collaboration with the federal and city secretariats of culture, the authorities of the historic center of Mexico City, the Consejo Nacional para la Cultura y las Artes, the Associación de Amigos del MAP and the BBDO company. Its purpose is a homage to Mexican handcrafts and folk art, especially cartonería (a kind of very hard paper mache) in order to restore value to it in modern society. In the spring or early summer, the Museo de Art Popular puts out an open call for participants, inviting individual artists and artisans along with museums, galleries, hotels, restaurants, businesses and public and private institutions. Notable artisans who have participated include Arturo Caballero Arroyo, Ricardo Hernández, Esteban G. Vargas, Laila Yamille Sabag, Enriqueta Landgrave Zamora and Fabián Hernández. Alebrijes have been sponsored by organizations such as CONACULTA, el Taller Los Olvidados, El FARO de Oriente, Arte en Papel, the Centro Cultural Xavier Villarrutia, Librarte, Arte Mexicano para el Mundo and the Mexico City Secretariat of Culture.

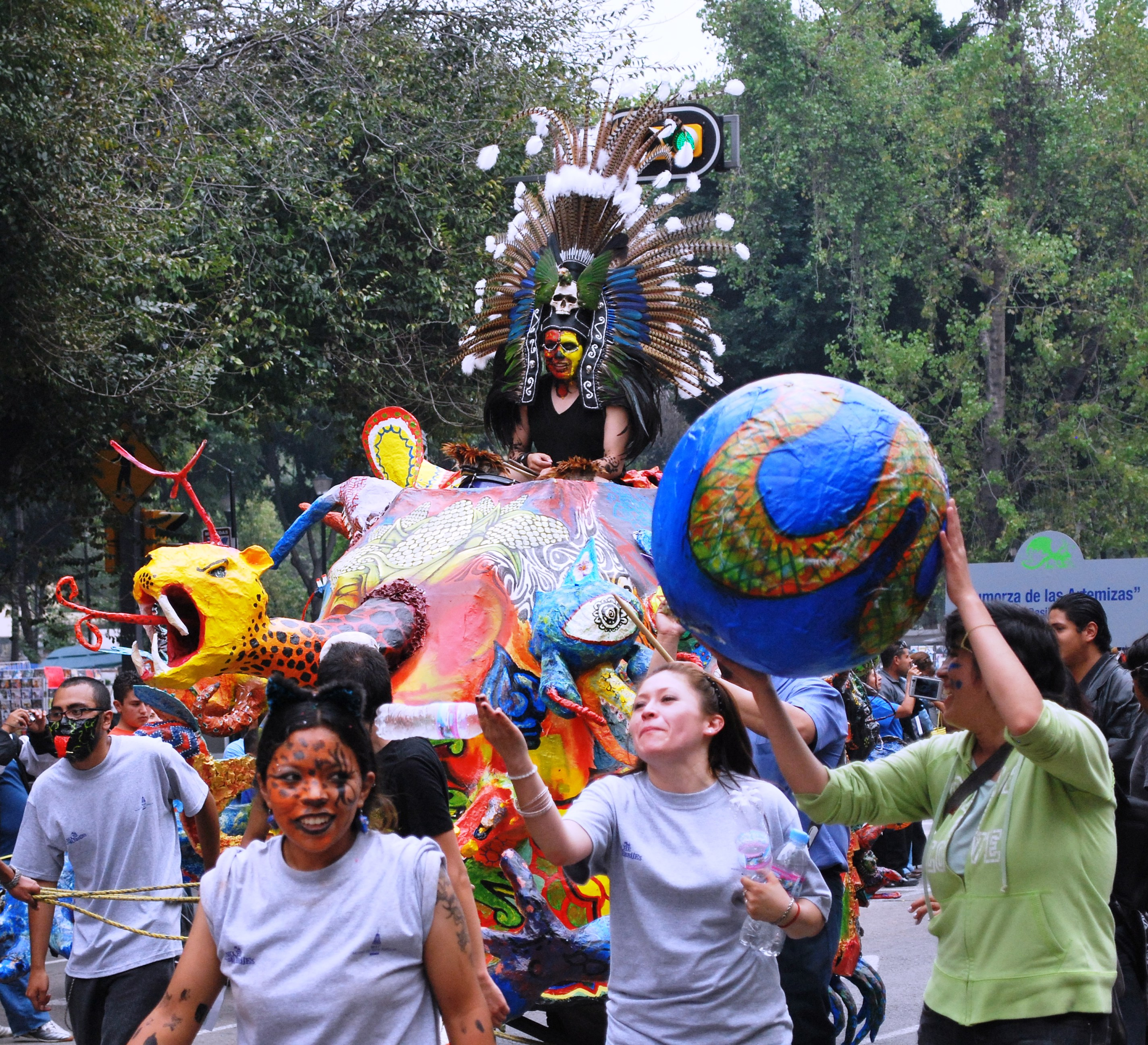
Participants pulling one of the alebrijes ridden by participant in Aztec costume

The parade begins at midday on a Saturday late in October, with about 400 uniformed officers needed to clear the parade route and keep order. This route takes the alebrijes through the historic center of Mexico City, from the main square or Zocalo, onto Paseo de la Reforma down to the Angel de la Independencia . Thousands of people, mostly children and their parents, line the 5.5 km parade route to see the creations. The alebrijes are accompanied by musical bands such as the Symphonic Band of the Navy, clowns, people on stilts and in costume, cheerleaders, acrobats, lucha libre wrestlers and more to give a Carnival like atmosphere. In addition to the alebrijes, other figures of cartonería appear such as Catrina figures, 30 cm brightly decorated skulls (related to Day of the Dead) as well as Judas figures (normally made for Holy Saturday) as a tribute to the traditional uses of this craft.

At the end of the parade, the alebrijes are placed on display on the sidewalk areas of Paseo de la Reforma between the Angel de la Independencia and the statue of Diana de Huntress for viewing and judging until early November. The prizes for the best alebrijes are 50,000, 30,000 and 20,000 pesos for first, second and third place.

In addition to the alebrijes themselves, there are two related literary competitions as well as one musical one. The literary competitions called the Concurso de Cuento sobre Alebrijes (Alebrije Story Contest) and the Concurso de Obra de Teatro para Títeres sobre Alebrijes (Alebrije Puppet Show Script Contest) . The literary contest is open to Mexican writers and foreign writers living in Mexico, with the works written in Spanish or an indigenous language of Mexico, with Spanish translation available. The work must be original and created for the event. There are first, second and third prizes for each of these competitions as well (40,000, 30,000 and 20,000 respectively), with the winners selected by audience vote. The music composition contest is called the Concurso de Música sobre Alebrijes (Alebrije Music Contest) . It also awards prizes for the best composition of fanfare music. The musical event has had judges such as Silvia Navarrete González, Betty Luisa Zanolli Fabila and Gustavo Rivero Weber.

== History ==
Animation clip about alebrijes and the parade by the Museo de Arte Popular in collaboration with Wiki Learning, Tec de Monterrey

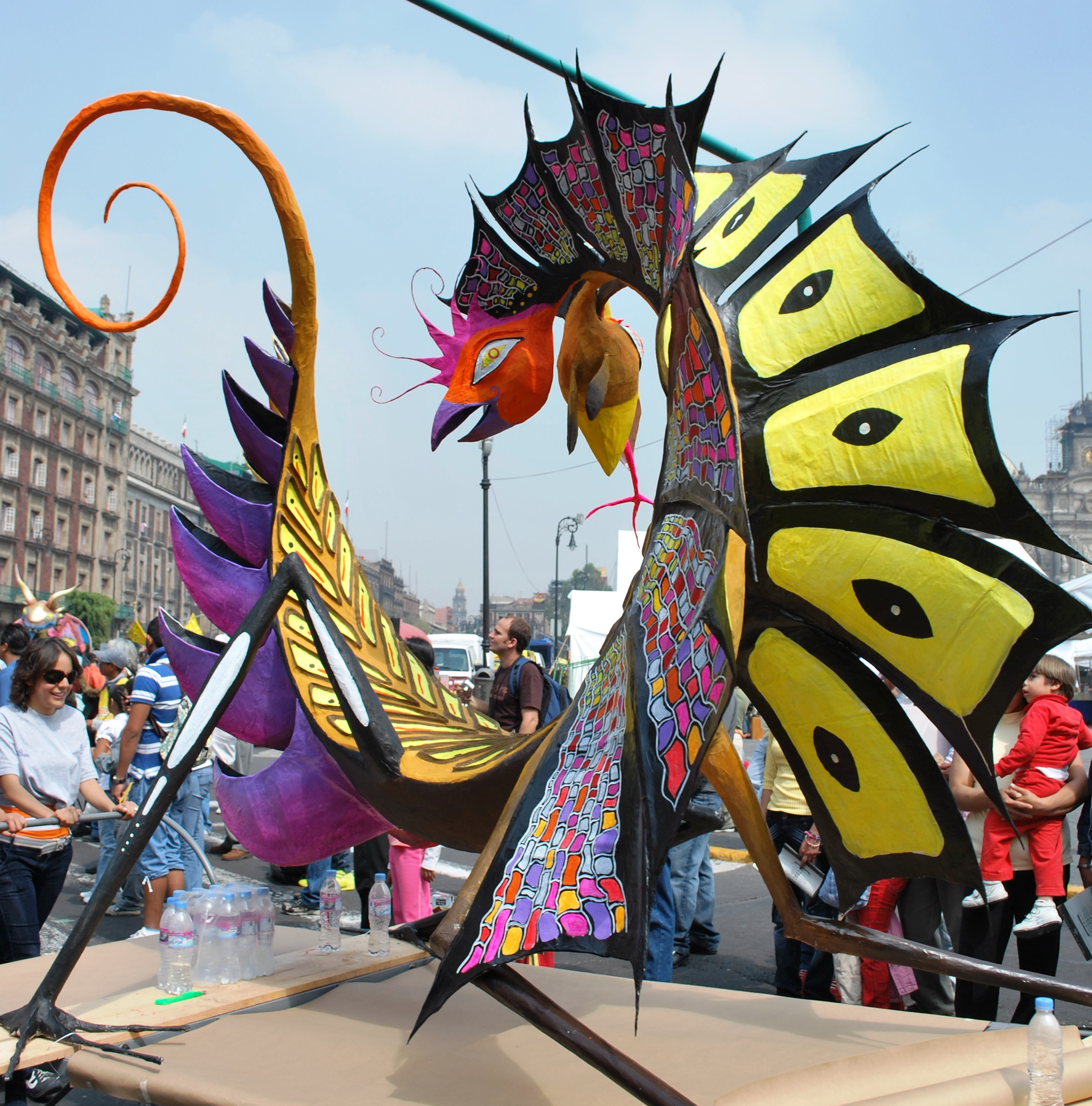
Alebrije named Coleccionista de Miradas or Gaze Collector

The annual event was begun in 2007 by the Museo de Arte Popular (MAP) with the purpose of establishing a Mexico City tradition related to valuing Mexican handcrafts and folk art. The reason that alebrijes were chosen for the event is that their wild shapes and colors create surprise for both Mexicans and foreigners, according to Museo de Arte Popular director Walther Boelsterly. Some of the first participants include Arturo Caballero, Felipe Linares and Arte en Papel. To date, it has succeeded in becoming a tradition for October, shortly before Day of the Dead.

Each year since its founding, the event has grown. During the first four years, 392 alebrijes were created for the event, with 3,600 people participating in their creation. The first year saw the participation of over forty alebrijes, with sizes ranging from thirty centimeters to four meters in height. This grew to over eighty in 2008, over 200 in 2010 about that many in 2011. About the same number of alebrijes participated in 2012, but with about 6,600 people creating the alebrijes for that year alone. During its first four years, the parade has over seven million spectators watching live or on television with six million watching in 2011. The creations have been as tall as 4.2 meters and as wide as three meters, transported to the event by their creators. There have been cases when the resulting alebrije was so big and heavy, the participants could not bring it to be on parade or displayed.

When the event was created in 2007, two other competitions for the creation of short stories and puppet shows about alebrijes were also begun. This was followed in 2008 but a musical competition. In 2011, there were ninety five literary entries: seventy seven short stories and eighteen scripts.

In 2010, the theme of the event was the heroes of the Mexican War of Independence and Mexican Revolution whose 200th and 100th anniversaries were celebrated that year. In 2010, the alebrijes included the visages of Miguel Hidalgo, Ignacio Allende, José María Morelos y Pavón, Francisco Villa, Emiliano Zapata, Victoriano Huerta, Porfírio Díaz, Agustín de Iturbide and others. In 2010, the winners were La Patria es Primero by Alejandro Camacho Barrera in first place, Si Adelita se fuera con otro by Daniel Macias Camacho in second place and El Masiosare by Hugo Orozco Flores in third place.

The success of the event has spawned a similar event at the Instituto Politécnico Nacional (IPN) in 2011 for students and professors. The difference with this event is that the alebrije have moving robotic parts, lights and more, but with the same purpose of promoting Mexican handcrafts. The same year, three of these robotic alebrijes called Agui-burro, P-Esime Pezadilla and Cyber-burro participated in the MAP event as well.

== The alebrijes ==
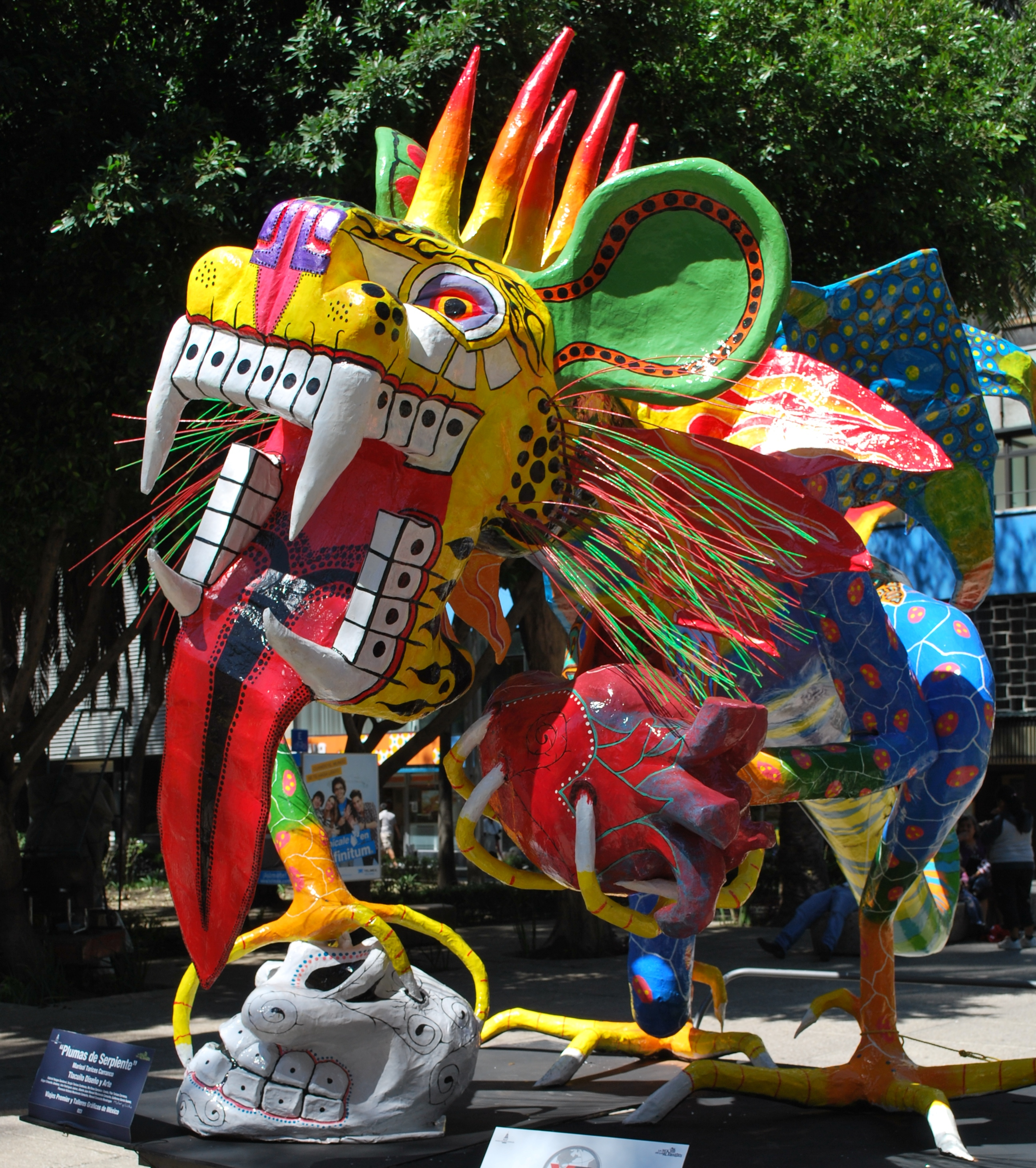
Alebrije named Plumas de Serpiente (Serpent Feathers) on display on Paseo de la Reforma in 2011

The monumental alebrijes of the parade are based on those credited to artisan Pedro Linares, who began creating fantastic, chimera-like, brightly colored creatures after dreaming them while ill. They generally combine elements of real and fantastic animals as well as humans including faces, wings, horns, hoofs, multiple heads, tails and more. No two alebrijes are exactly alike.(arthistory) . The alebrijes are generally made with a technique called cartonería, a very hard type of papier-mâché, although other materials can be used as well. The difference is that these alebrijes are far larger than anything Linares ever made, with sizes ranging up to four meters in height and three meters in width. Mexican sculptor Ricardo Linares has participated with creations such as a Chinese dragon with a snail’s head, eagle claws and octopus tentacles. It was three meters tall, four meters long, 2.5 meters wide and weighed over 350 kilograms. It was made with paper, fiberglass and resin.

The creatures are not meant to be scary as much as fantastic. They generally have a dream like quality and their appearance as well as name is supposed to convey an emotion or attitude. These alebrijes have incorporated elements of pre Hispanic myth along with images from Europe, Asia and Africa. The names given to the creations are generally fanciful such as El malévolo (The Evil One), Señor Mariposa (Mr. Butterfly), “Por si las moscas” (For if the flies), “Jejete,” “Viaje alegre al Viento” (The Wind Travels Happy) and Dragón de la Esperanza (Dragon of Hope) as well as names from Nahuatl such as Tepitecac, Xolotl and Ehecatl.

They are created in local workshops and transported to the event by their creators. One of the main problems aspiring participants have is obtaining sponsorship for the creation of the monumental pieces. The creation of the pieces is expensive. Smaller figures can cost on average of 10,000 pesos to create. For a figure of over four meters, the cost is between 50,000 and 70,000 pesos as metal frames need to be used along with paper, paint and other materials.

== See also ==
- Day of the Dead Parade
