= Pedro Linares =

Mexican creator of alebrijes (1906–1992)

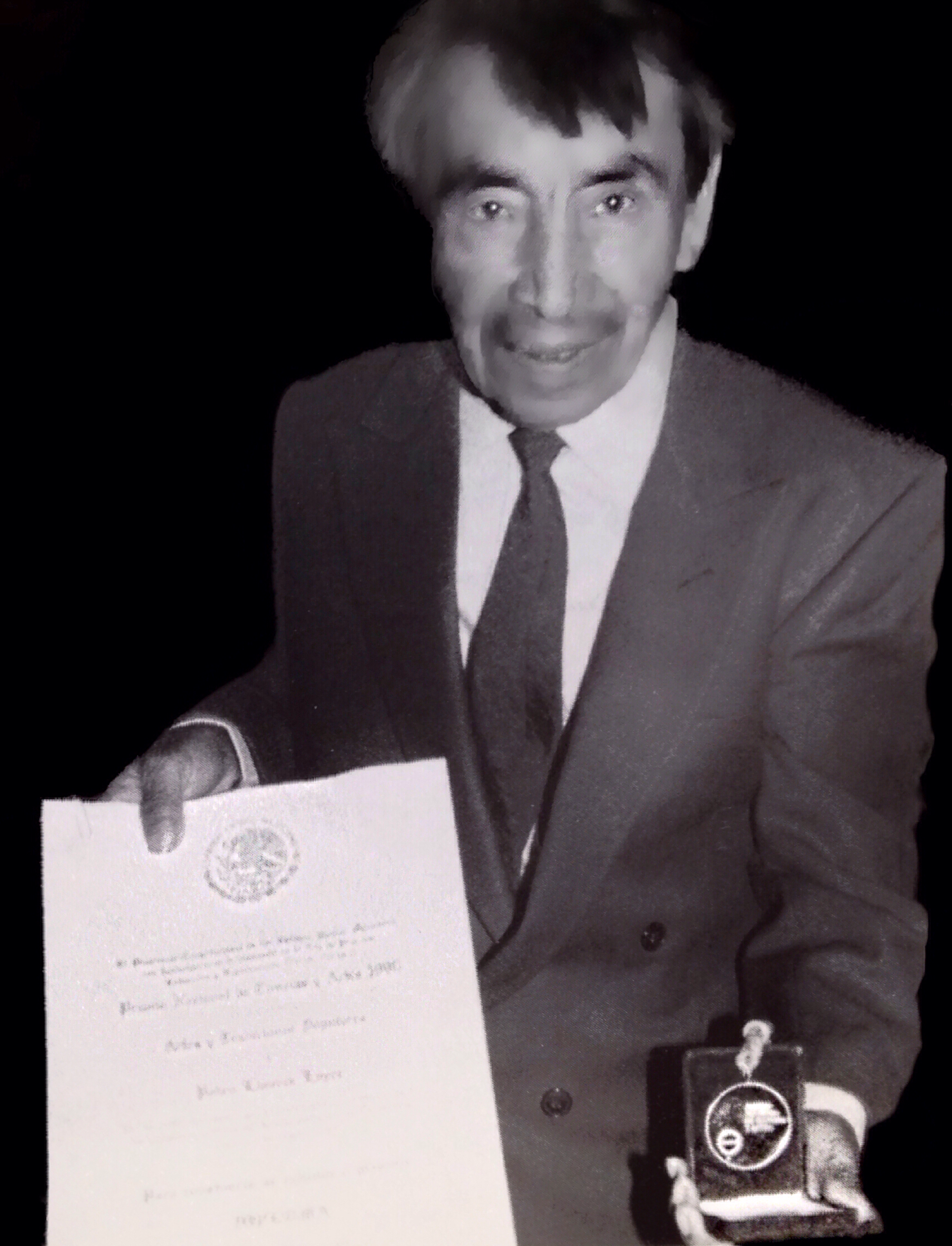
Pedro Linares López Artist Pedro Linares López, the father of Alebrijes shows National Prize for Science and Arts (Mexico) 1990
- Born: June 29, 1906; Mexico City, Mexico
- Died: January 25, 1992 (aged 85)
- Occupation: Artist
- Known for: Coining the word and concept Alebrije and its plural form Alebrijes
- Awards: National Prize for Arts and Sciences (1990)

Pedro Linares López (29 June 1906 – 25 January 1992) was a Mexican artist born in Mexico City known for coining the word and the concept alebrijes, zoomorphic Cartonería figures.

== Career ==
Pedro Linares began his career as a maker of the effigies known as Judas figures, traditionally made of carton during the Catholic Easter season in Mexico, and by making figurines for Diego Rivera, Frida Kahlo and other artists from the Academia de San Carlos School of Fine Arts in Mexico City. The "Alebrije" were created by Linares when he was 30 years old at 1936, after he suffered high fever and unconsciousness caused by peritonitis. During his convalescence in 1936, Pedro Linares López experienced a lucid dream that transported him to an unusual forest. In this dream, he encountered fantastic, polychrome creatures that proclaimed the word “alebrijes.” Among these dream figures were a winged donkey, a lion with a dog's head, and a rooster with bull's horns.

After peritonitis subsided, Linares began to materialize his vision and the art of making alebrijes was born. He wanted his family and others to know about the animals he dreamt of by taking a piece of paper and molding the figures from his memory and then painting them as he saw them in his dream.

Pedro Linares gained national and international attention following the 1975 documentary Linares: Artesano de Cartón from Judith Bronowski. Part of a documentary series on Mexican folk craft, it resulted in traveling workshops from the films' subjects. Among them was Manuel Jiménez Ramírez, a wood sculptor who took the concept of alebrijes from Linares and began producing wooden "Oaxacan alebrijes". Besides the material, Oaxacan alebrijes differ in being more realistic representations of animals and incorporating ideas of the nahual.

In 1990, Linares was awarded the National Prize for Arts and Sciences (Premio Nacional de Ciencias y Artes) in the Popular Arts and Traditions category, the highest decoration to artisans granted by the federal government of Mexico.

The work done by Linares for Diego Rivera is now displayed at the Anahuacalli Museum in Mexico City.

In the United States, exhibitions of his work were held at the Smithsonian Institution, The Children's Museum of Indianapolis, the Craft Contemporary, the Museum of Us and the Fullerton Museum Center.

== Death ==
Linares died at the age of 85 in 1992.

His three children and later grandchildren helped preserve Linares' name with the refined art of cartonería. Alebrijes continue to be produced by the Linares family and in other workshops across Mexico.

== See also ==
- Alebrije
- Linares family
- Cartonería
- Mexico City
- Mercado de Sonora
