= Manuel Jiménez Ramírez =

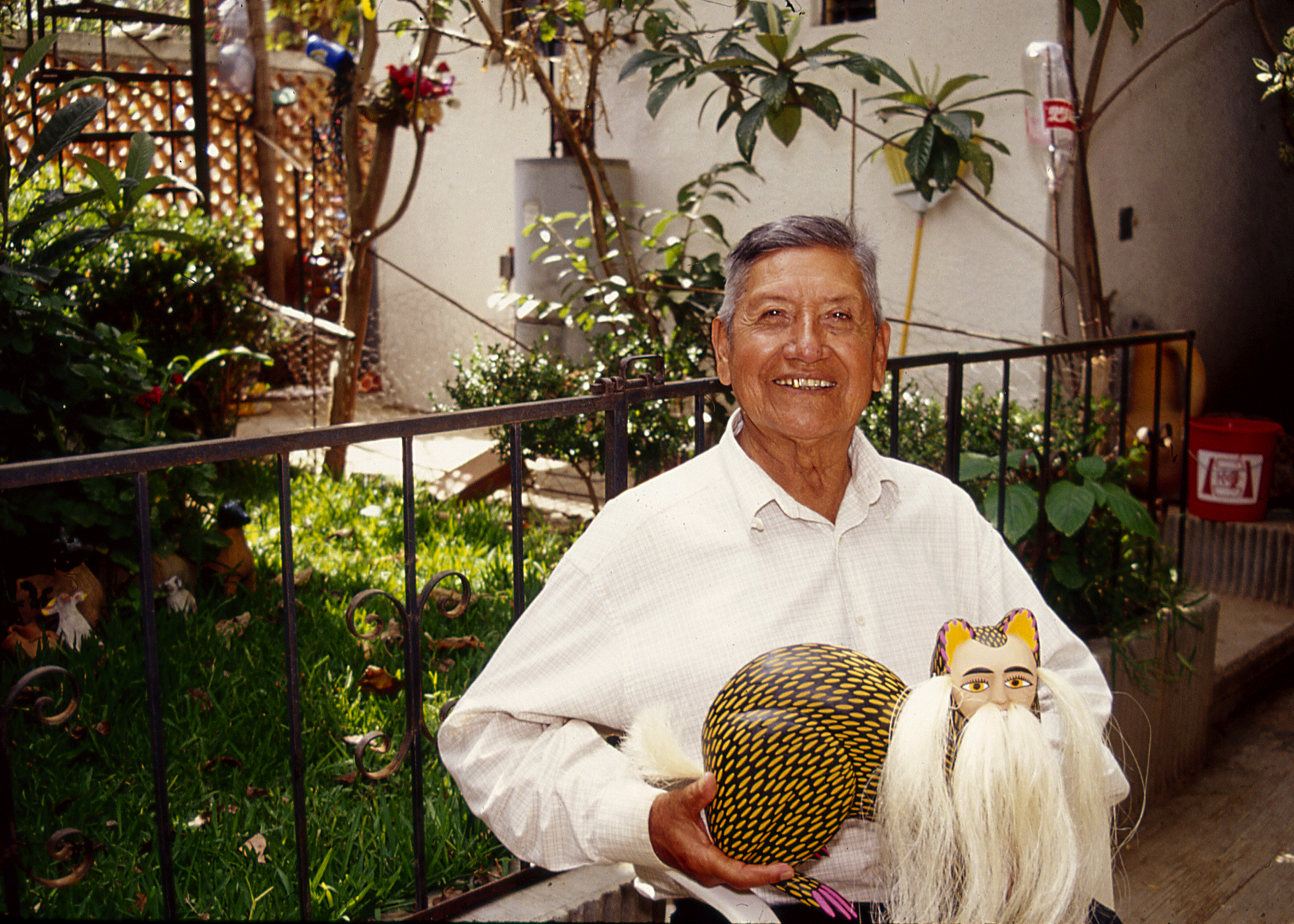
- Manuel Jimenez holding one of his woodcarvings
- Born: 9 June 1919; San Antonio Arrazola, Oaxaca, Mexico
- Died: 4 March 2005 (aged 85); San Antonio Arrazola, Oaxaca, Mexico
- Occupations: Mexican woodcarver, originator of Oaxaca alebrijes

Manuel Jiménez Ramírez (9 June 1919 – 4 March 2005) was a Mexican carver, sculptor and painter credited as the originator of the Oaxacan version of “alebrijes,” animal creatures carved in wood and painted in strong contrasting colours with intricate designs. He was a charismatic and philosophical person, who believed he was the reincarnation of an artist. He began making animal figures of clay when he was a child but changed to wood carving later, creating human figures, nativity scenes, masks and more as well as the alebrijes. His work can be found in public and private collections in various parts of the world, especially in the United States.

== Life ==
Jiménez Ramírez was born in San Antonio Arrazola, Oaxaca, 10m southeast of the city of Oaxaca. He began making animal figures from clay when he was eight, then switched to wood. He was a charismatic person, dedicated to philosophical studies and believed he was the reincarnation of an artist. He was nicknamed “el divino” and a number of neighbors considered him a nahual. He was also considered a kind of “curandero” and led Holy Week activities for the town.

During his life he engaged in other activities, depending on his whim, such as cutting sugar cane in Veracruz and Oaxaca, bricklaying, basket making, hairdressing and more. He died at the age of 86 in his hometown.

== Wood carving ==
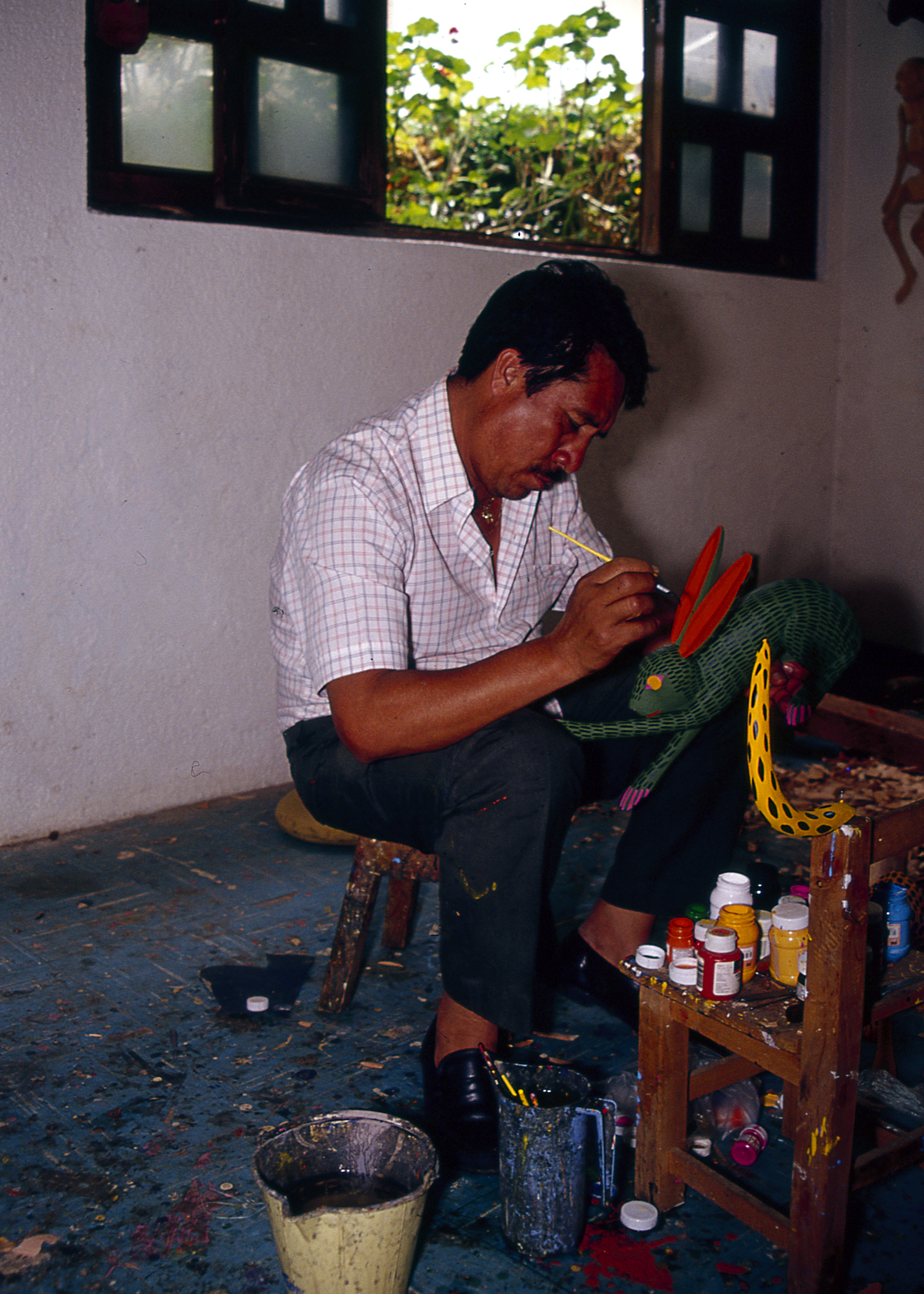
Angelico Jimenez, son of Manuel, in the family workshop

Jiménez Ramírez is credited with creating the Oaxacan version of “alebrijes.” The original craft was created and promoted by the Linares family in Mexico City, making fantastic creatures of “cartonería” (a hard paper mache) and painting them in bright colors. The Oaxaca version is made of wood, with figures closer to nahuals than the creatures of various animal parts of Mexico City. Both kinds are painting in strong contrasting colours and with detailed designs. Jiménez Ramírez also often added hair and beards made of ixtle, another indication of their nahual origins. The artisan never taught his techniques outside his own family but in the early 1980s others began to imitate these figures. This eventually attracted a tourism trade to the area.

While best known for his alebrijes, Jiménez Ramírez’s carving repertoire includes various other kind of pieces including human figures, religious objects and masks, especially animal masks. He made altarpieces, nativity scenes and scenes of everyday life with great detail, often with a sense of fantasy and artistic liberty.

Jiménez Ramírez worked in copalillo, zompantle, palo de Aguila and cedar, with the first two collected locally. The latter he bought from vendors in Valle Nacional and the Isthmus of Tehuantepec. He selected pieces of wood, usually large, with an image of what he wanted to carve, in order to take advantage of the wood’s size and shape. Initial working was often with a machete. Some delicate parts such as ears and tails were made separately and added to the main body. He painted the pieces with commercial enamel paints.

The artisan’s work can be found in public and private collections around the world, especially in museums in the United States. He was named a “grand master” of Mexican folk art by the Fomento Cultural Banamex.

== Manuel’s sons ==
His sons Angélico (born 1954) and Isaías (born 1961) continue in their father’s footsteps, working to guard a tradition of designs they consider their own. Angélico has been working as a carver, sculptor and painter for over fifty years and Isaías for over forty five. Both have their own workshops and are assisted by their wives and children.
