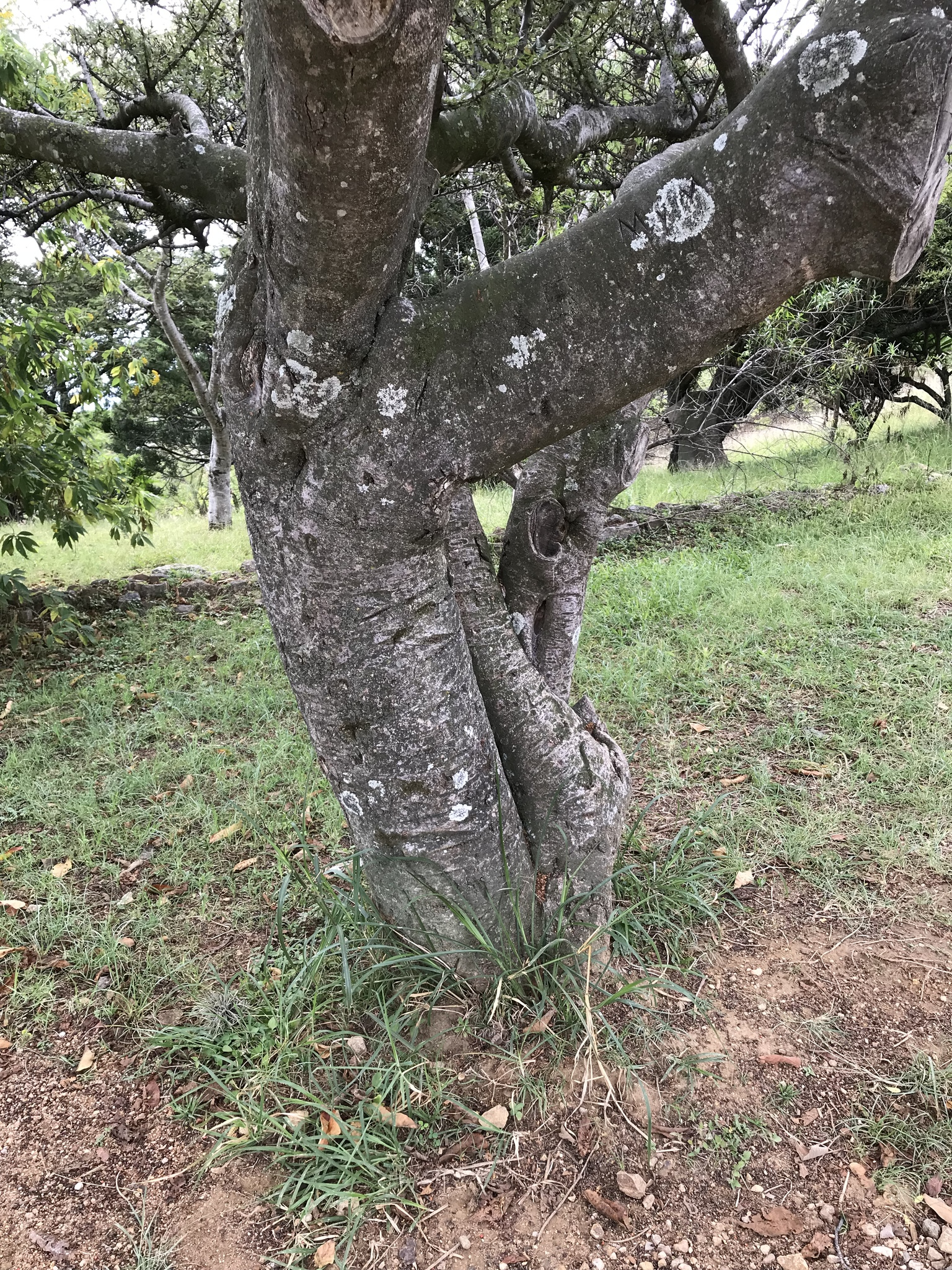

Conservation status
- Least Concern (IUCN 3.1)

Scientific classification
- Kingdom: Plantae
- Clade: Tracheophytes
- Clade: Angiosperms
- Clade: Eudicots
- Clade: Rosids
- Order: Sapindales
- Family: Burseraceae
- Genus: Bursera
- Species: B. bipinnata

Binomial name
- Bursera bipinnata (Moc. & Sessé ex DC.) Engl. 1881

Synonyms
- List: Amyris bipinnata Moc. & Sessé ex DC. 1825; Bursera bipinnata var. ovatifolia Donn. Sm.; Bursera elemifera (Royle) Baill.; Bursera gracilis Engl.; Bursera tenuifolia Engl. ex Kuntze; Bursera verapacensis Pittier; Elaphrium bipinnatum (Moc. & Sessé ex DC.) Schltdl.; Elaphrium elemiferum Royle; Elaphrium gracile (Engl.) Rose; Elemifera bipinnata (Moc. & Sessé ex DC.) Kuntze; Terebinthus bipinnata (Moc. & Sessé ex DC.) W.Wight ex Rose; Terebinthus gracilis (Engl.) Rose

= Bursera bipinnata =

Species of flowering plant

Bursera bipinnata is a Mesoamerican species of trees widespread across Mexico and Central America from Chihuahua to Honduras.

Bursera bipinnata is one of two species commonly referred to as copal. Copal is the wood most commonly used by the woodcarvers in Oaxaca, Mexico. The woodcarvers refer to Bursera glabrifolia as "macho" or male copal, which they like less than Bursera bipinnata, which they refer to as "Hembra" or female copal.
