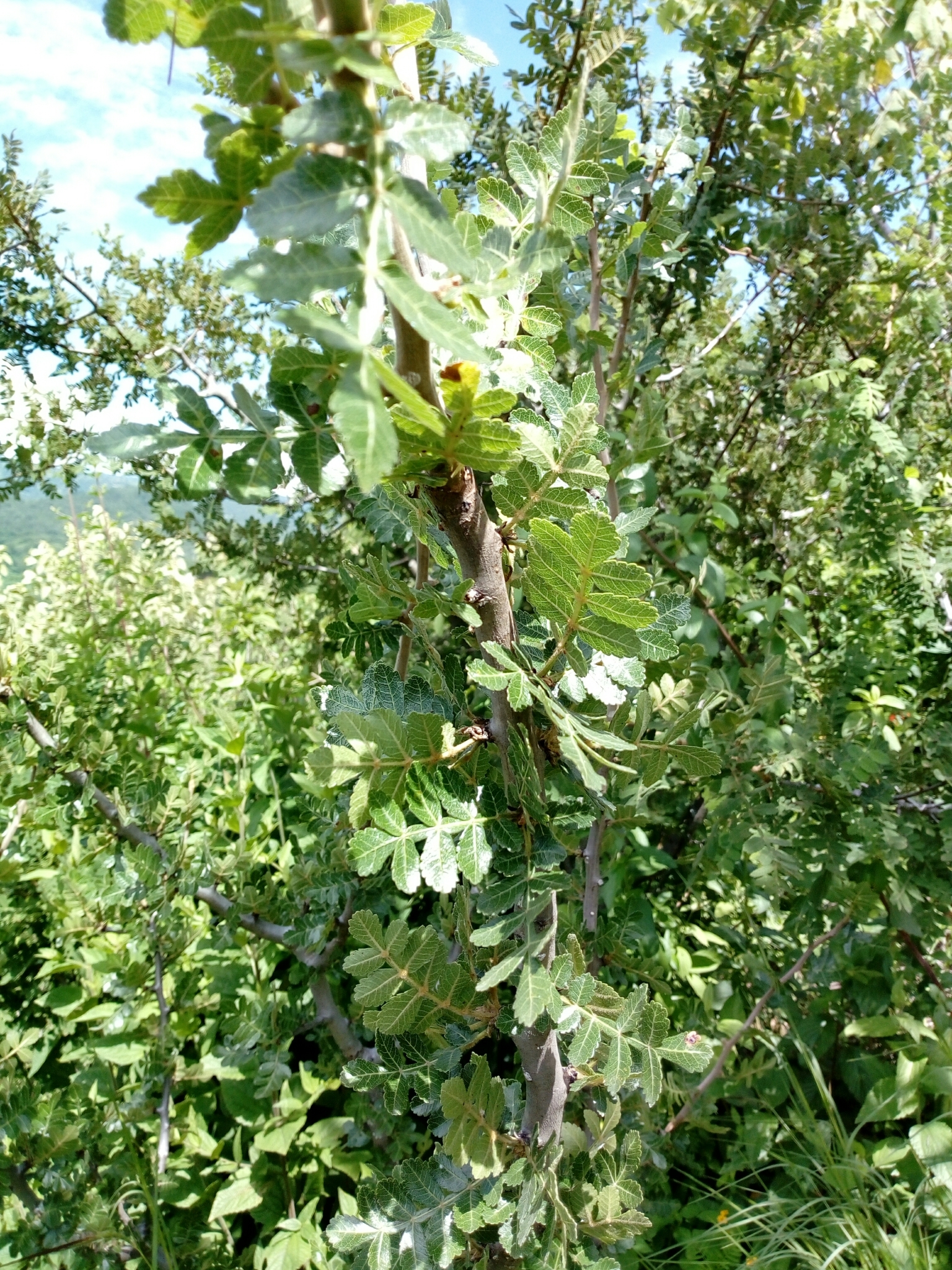

Conservation status
- Least Concern (IUCN 3.1)

Scientific classification
- Kingdom: Plantae
- Clade: Embryophytes
- Clade: Tracheophytes
- Clade: Spermatophytes
- Clade: Angiosperms
- Clade: Eudicots
- Clade: Rosids
- Order: Sapindales
- Family: Burseraceae
- Genus: Bursera
- Species: B. glabrifolia

Binomial name
- Bursera glabrifolia (Kunth) Engl. 1896

Synonyms
- List: Elaphrium glabrifolium Kunth 1824; Bursera nelsonii Rose; Bursera schiedeana Engl.; Elaphrium aloexylon Schied. ex Schltdl.; Elaphrium nelsonii (Rose) Rose; Elaphrium schiedeanum (Engl.) Rose; Terebinthus aloexylon (Schiede ex Schltdl.) W. Wight ex Rose; Terebinthus nelsonii (Rose) Rose; Terebinthus schiedeana (Engl.) Rose

= Bursera glabrifolia =

Species of flowering plant

Bursera glabrifolia is a species of tree native to central Mexico (Guerrero, Morelos, Michoacán, México State, Puebla, Oaxaca).

Bursera glabrifolia is one of two species commonly referred to as copal. Copal is the wood most commonly used by the woodcarvers in Oaxaca, Mexico. The woodcarvers refer to Bursera glabrifolia as "macho" or male copal, which they like less than Bursera bipinnata, which they refer to as "Hembra" or female copal.

Bursera glabrifolia is a small tree native to the tropical dry forests of Mexico. It was first described by Carl Sigismund Kunth in 1824 as Elaphrium glabrifolium and then transferred to the genus Bursera by Adolf Engler in 1896.
