= Rodolfo Villena Hernández =

Mexican artisan (born 1968)

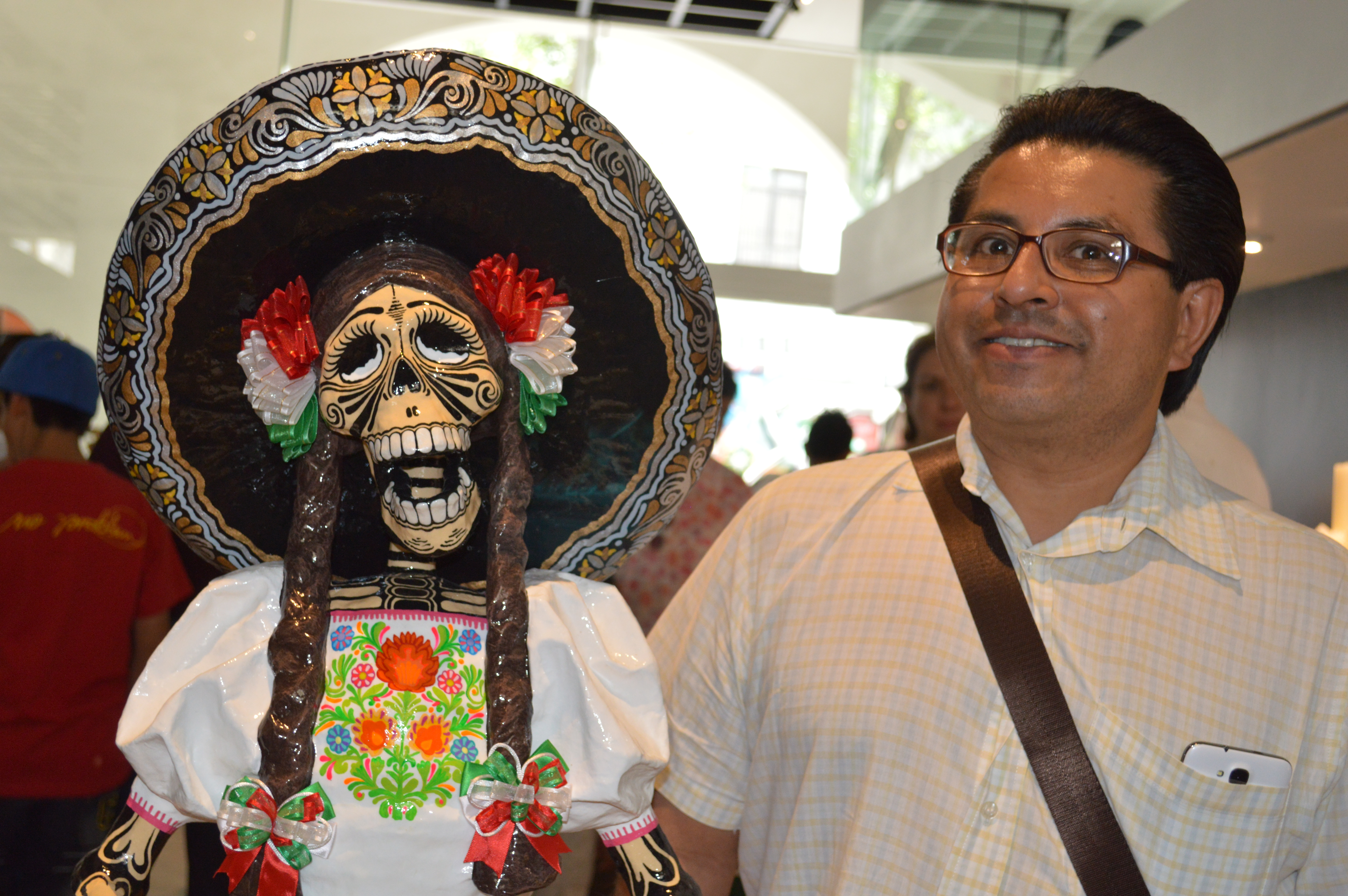
The artisan with a skeletal image of La China Poblana at the Museo de Arte Popular in Mexico City

Rodolfo Villena Hernández (born 1968) is a Mexican artisan who specializes in cartonería, a type of hard papier-mâché used to sculpt piñatas, holiday decorations, Judas figures as well as the building of monumental works.

His works have been exhibited in Puebla, Mexico City and Chicago. He has also been involved in theater. His work has been recognized with various awards over his career.

== Earky life and education ==
Villena Hernández was born in Mexico City to parents who taught him to respect Mexican traditions and encouraged his interest in them. He began creating his own Day of the Dead altars when he was age ten in the family garage. He studied history at the National Autonomous University of Mexico, then moved to the city of Puebla when he was age twenty three, where he still lives.

== Cartonería career ==
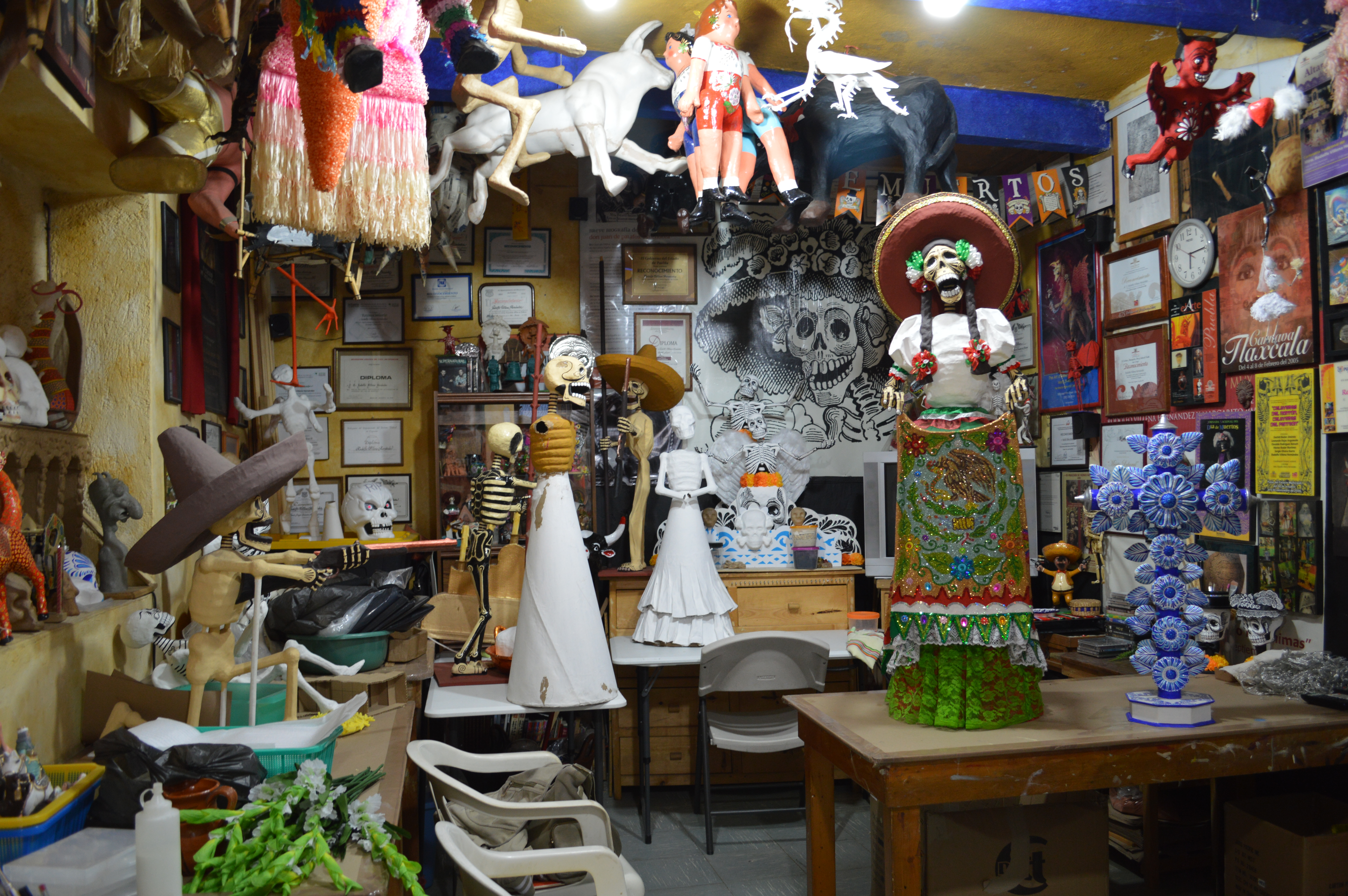
View of Villena Hernández's workshop in Puebla

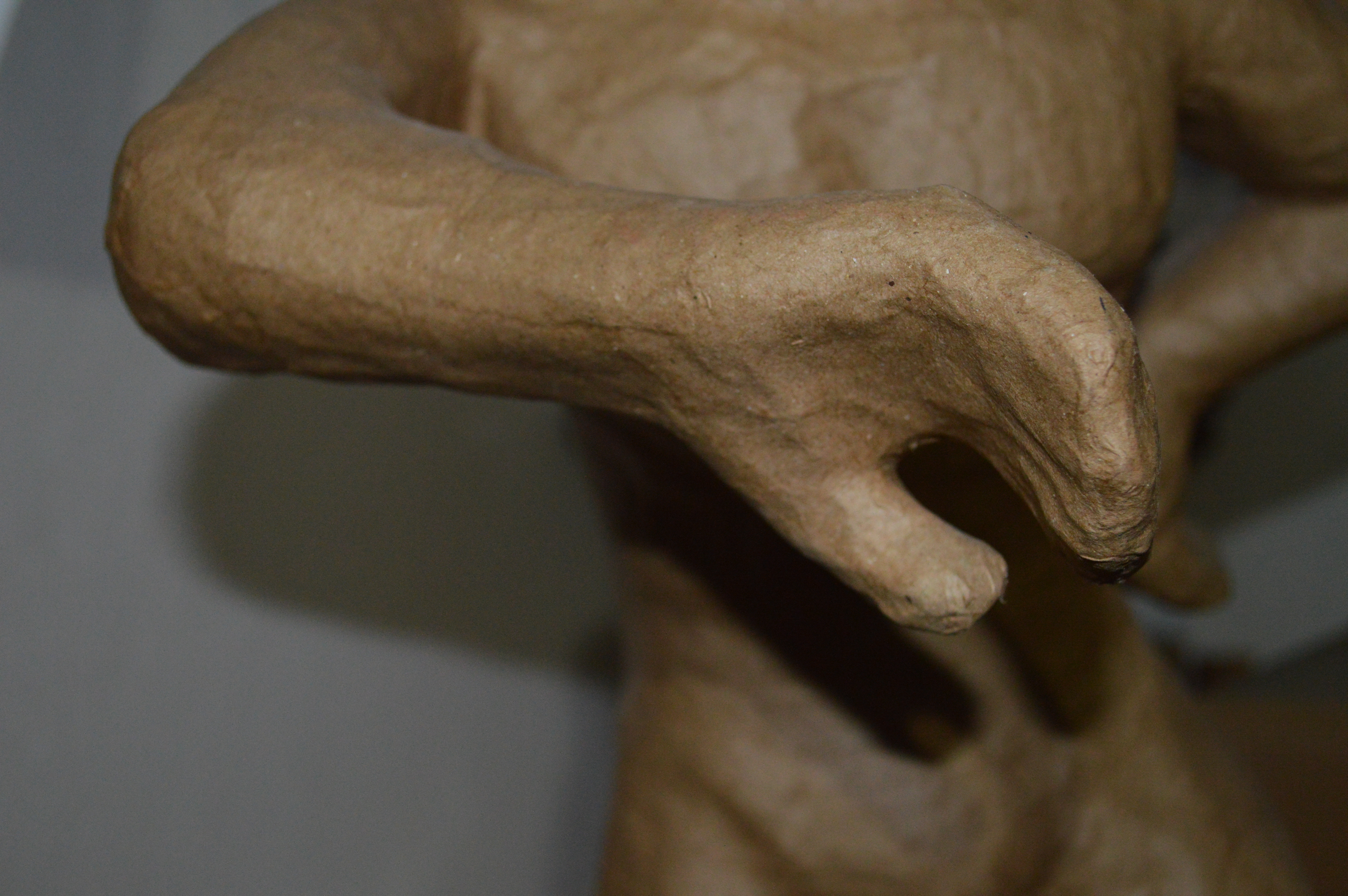
Close up of piece in progress

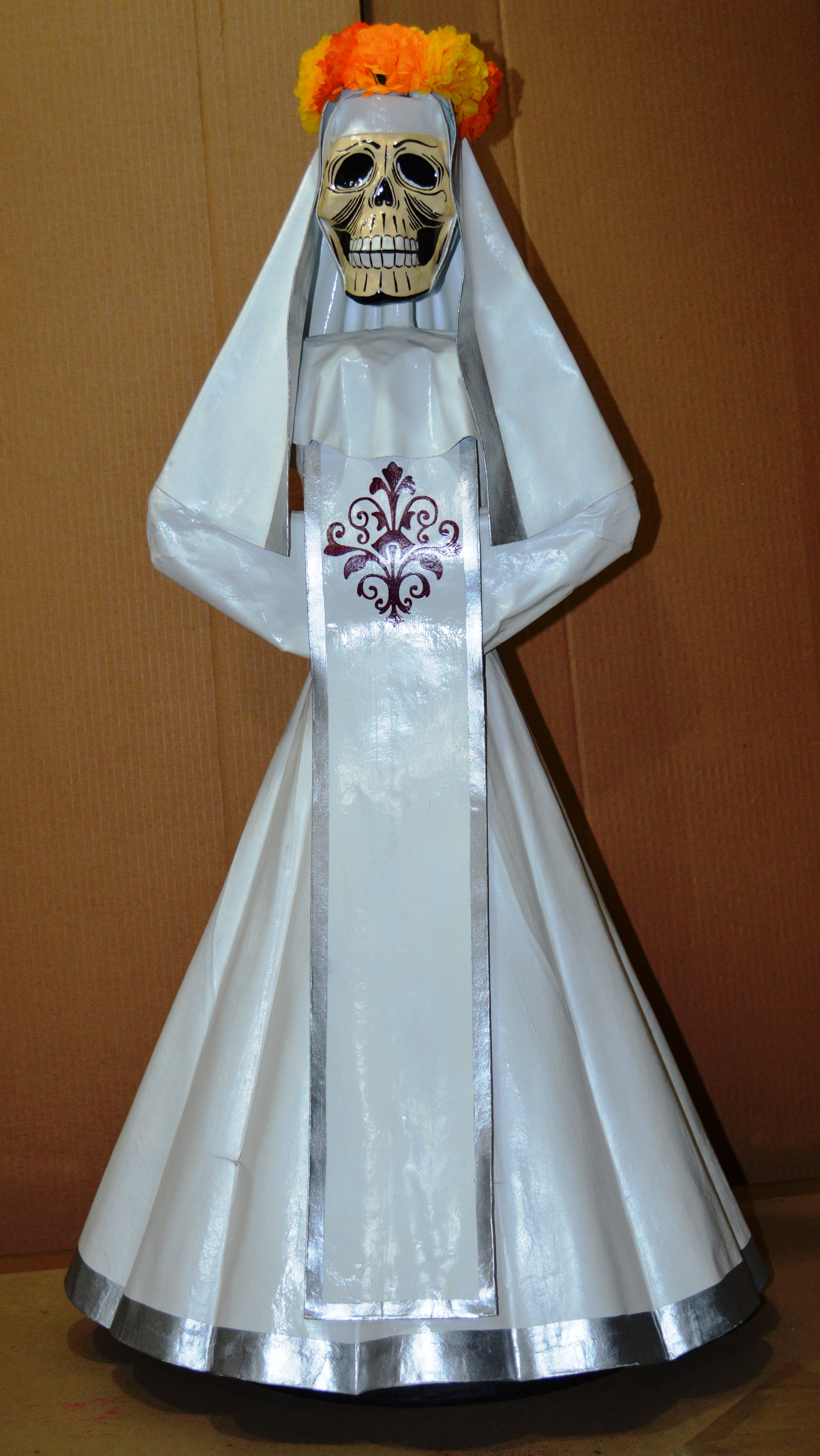
Finished skeletal nun piece

He began his artisan career in 1990, after taking classes in cartonería, with a break for a year in 1996 when he went to New York to earn money selling chicharrones. Since then, he has been dedicated to cartonería full-time. His workshop is just outside the city of Puebla on the old highway linking this city to that of Tlaxcala, an old industrial corridor. The exterior is non-descript, distinguished only by his name on the door. Inside, there are two rooms filled with creations in various stages of completion as well as walls covered in various recognitions.

Villena Hernández makes most of the traditional cartonería objects such as piñatas, Lupita dolls, Judas figures, but he has become known for monumental works commissioned by government and cultural institutions in Puebla and Mexico City related to Holy Week, Christmas, Corpus Christi and the Day of the Dead. Of these, his altars related to the Day of the Dead are of particular note, especially the skeletal figures that adorn them.

He has created altars in honor of Juan de Palafox y Mendoza (2009) for the Puebla city hall, the Mexican Revolution for the Complejo Cultural Universitaria of the Benemérita Universidad Autónoma de Puebla (2010), the China Poblana with various students for the Puebla city hall (2012) and one for José Guadalupe Posada for the National Museum of Mexican Art in Chicago (2013) .

The artisan represents death as something happy, fun and irreverent, with the skeletal figures in movement. His works also show influence from José Guadalupe Posada in their sense of irony.

His work has been exhibited in various locations in Mexico as well as New York, Chicago, Philadelphia and Madrid, which included an invitation to the National Museum of Mexican Art for a month. His work can be found in public and private collections including that of Richard Harris's collection of death memorabilia and at the Casa de Venados in Mérida, Yucatán.

However, he says that his work is better appreciated outside of Mexico, with few in the country willing to pay what the creations are worth. He also finds it difficult to get government and non-governmental support to exhibit outside the country. To supplement his income from sales, he also gives classes and rents pieces for showings.

Villena Hernández’s cartonería work has won awards and recognitions in Puebla, other parts of Mexico and the United States. In 2001, he won first place at the Premio de Arte Popular of FONART, for a 3.4-meter train boarded by skeletal figures depicting the Mexican Revolution, which took six months and seven kilos of paper to make. He was named one of the 475 distinguished citizens of the state of Puebla. In 2013, he was named a "master of popular art" (maestro de arte popular) by the Museo de Arte Popular in Mexico City. He has also been interviewed for radio, television and newspapers for his work related to culture.

== Theatrical career ==
In addition to his cartonería, Villena Hernández has also been involved with the theatre, directing and producing plays with his own company (Compañia Teatral de Rodolfo Villena) . He also wrote and produced a play, La Gatita del Principal, as a tribute to María Conesa in 1994.
