= Cartonería =

Mexican handcraft art form

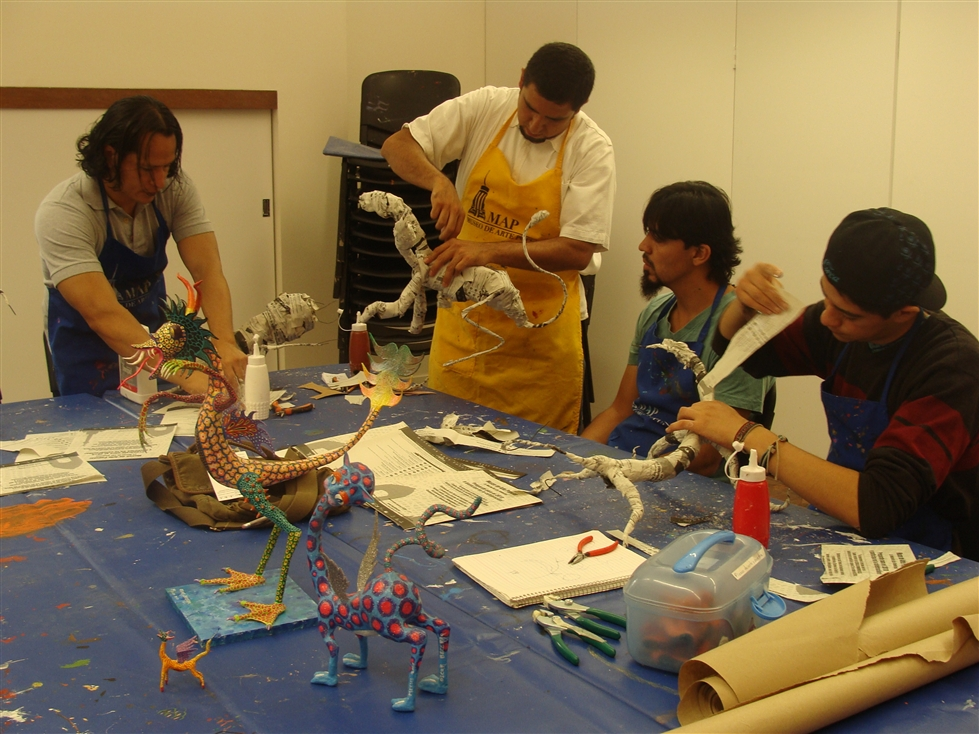
Cartonería workshop at the Museo de Arte Popular, Mexico City making alebrijes

Cartonería or papier-mâché sculptures are a traditional handcraft in Mexico. The papier-mâché works are also called "carton piedra" (rock cardboard) for the rigidness of the final product. These sculptures today are generally made for certain yearly celebrations, especially for the Burning of Judas during Holy Week and various decorative items for Day of the Dead. However, they also include piñatas, mojigangas, masks, dolls and more made for various other occasions. There is also a significant market for collectors as well. Papier-mâché was introduced into Mexico during the colonial period, originally to make items for church. Since then, the craft has developed, especially in central Mexico. In the 20th century, the creation of works by Mexico City artisans Pedro Linares and Carmen Caballo Sevilla were recognized as works of art with patrons such as Diego Rivera. The craft has become less popular with more recent generations, but various government and cultural institutions work to preserve it.

== History ==
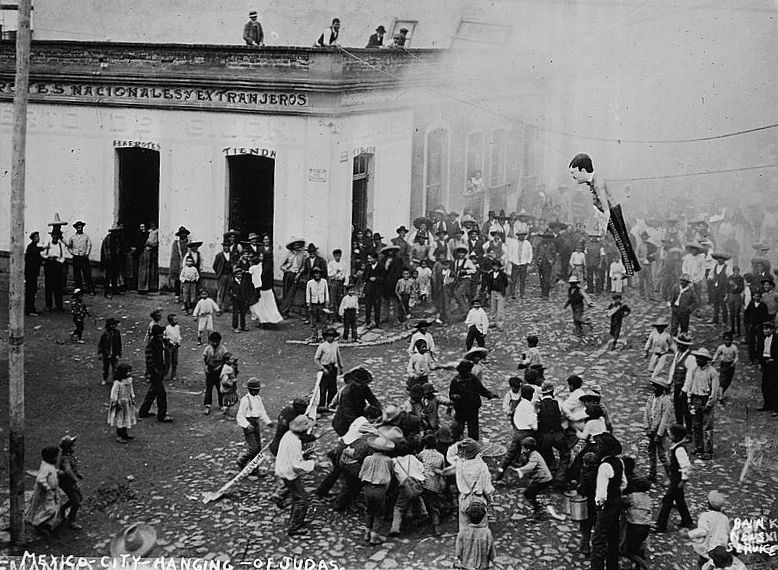
Burning of Judas early 20th century

Cartonería, the making of three-dimensional sculptures with papier-mâché, is part of Mexico's tradition of paper based handcrafts. Paper was developed in the region during the Mesoamerican period using the bark of a type of fig tree called amate or the fibers of the maguey plant. The Spanish banned its production after the Conquest, because of its use in religious rites, forcing the conversion to European and Asian produced paper. However, the ban never was complete and the production of amate paper still continues especially in parts of Puebla and Veracruz states.

A kind of "proto-cartonería" was done in the early colonial period. At this time, layers of paper were affixed using animal glue to make versions of religious icons to be used in processions.

Modern papier-mâché was introduced into Mexico around the 17th century as a way to make objects for churches with its use most developed in central Mexico. In Celaya, the creation of these figures became a trade much the way metalwork and pottery did, with the work dominated by certain families. Since this time, the technique has been used to make a wide variety of objects for both ritual, festival and decorative use, mostly by poorer indigenous and mestizo communities. The paper and cardboard used is mostly waste paper, such as old newspapers and boxes, with decorative elements, such as crepe paper being new. Most shapes are created with molds, then painted with acrylics.

Most of the production since colonial times has followed the annual calendar of religious and civic events. Today, this includes figures of horses with wheels for Epiphany, figures of Judas Iscariot to burn for Holy Saturday, parrots for May and clowns for June. For the feast of John the Evangelist, traditional figures include ponies, clowns and dolls with movable legs and arms. For Independence Day in September, objects include play helmets and swords, along with images of eagles and Father Hidalgo. Day of the Dead produces figures such as skeletons which "dance" when dangled on the end of a string, skulls and coffins, with Christmas producing nativity scenes and traditional piñatas with points. Year round production includes piñatas for birthday parties, which usually represent figures from popular culture as well as mojigangas, masks, alebrijes and dolls. There is also a significant market for items created for collectors.

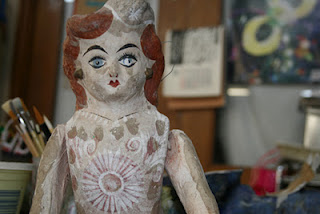
Cartonería doll from second half of 20th century

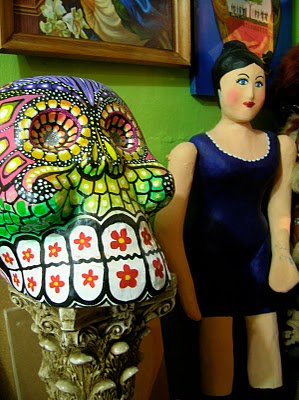
Cartonería doll and decorated cartonería skull

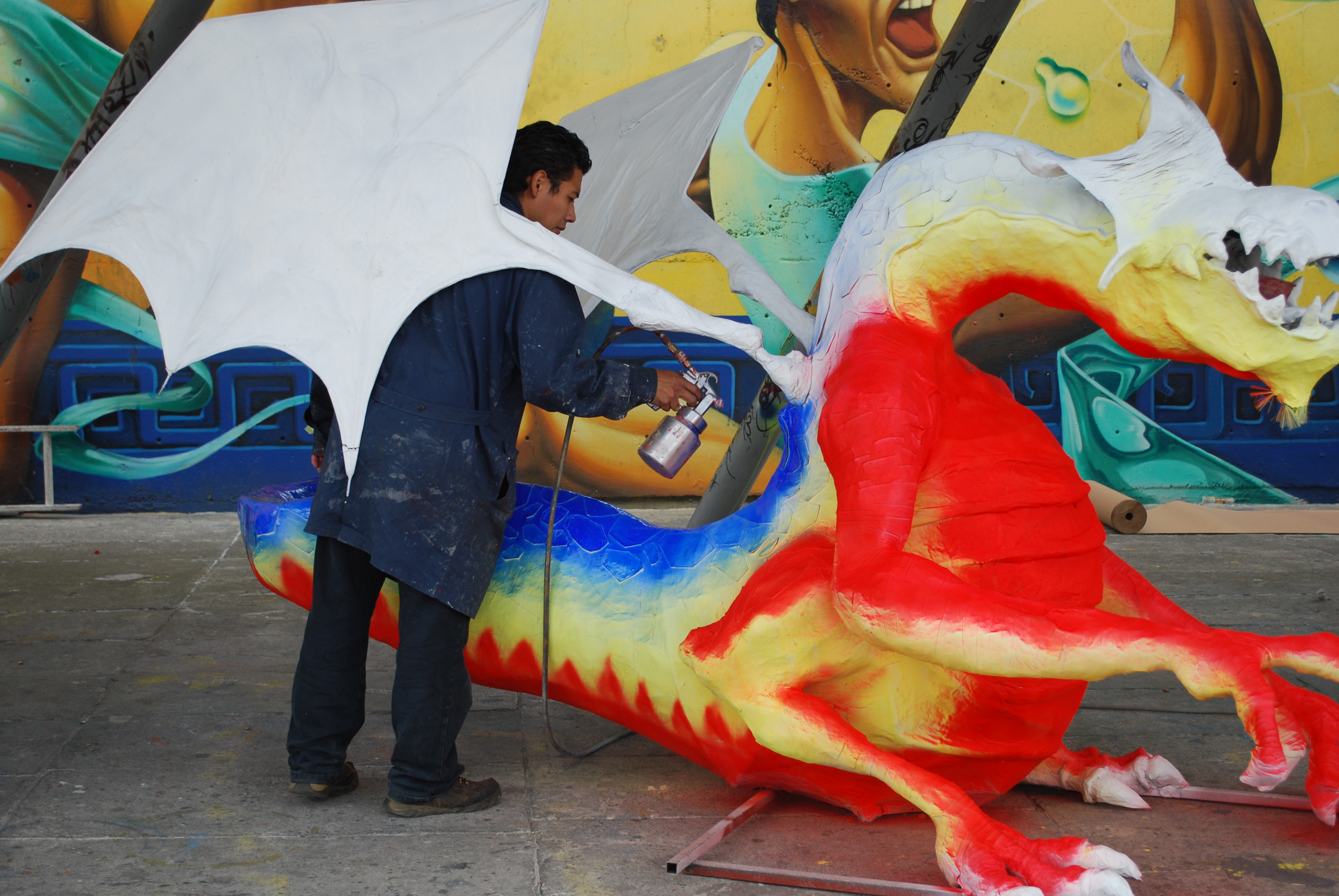
Giant alebrije being painted at the Fábrica de Artes y Oficios Oriente center in Mexico City

Mexico City has the best known production of cartonería, with markets such as La Merced, Jamaica and Sonora centers for its sale. Celaya is known for its production of cardboard and papier-mâché toys and masks, which begins in January and February in time for Carnival. Toys include "Prussian" helmets and swords and dolls whose arms and legs are movable which often have the name of the child painted on the chest. The masks represent clowns, devils, goats, witches, old people, sultans, monkeys and beautiful women. They are formed using clay, wood or plaster molds, and then decorated with paint and other materials for create details such as mustaches. The Cora indigenous population in Jesús María, El Nayar and Santa Teresa communities in Nayarit create papier-mâché masks for Holy Week, often to depict the Pharisees. These are generally placed in the river on Holy Saturday to dissolve as an act of purification.

Cartonería work received a boost from the work of 20th century artisans such as Pedro Linares and Carmen Caballero Sevilla, who created more artistic works, reinventing traditional forms and creating new ones. These caught the attention of artists such as Diego Rivera and academics, creating a new market related to collectors. The Linares family remains internationally known for its creations, and has trained other artists such as Ruben Guzman in Oakland, CA. Despite its historic importance, fewer of the younger generations are dedicating themselves to the crafts as many of the areas known for it, such as Mexico City and Celaya, continue to urbanize. To counter this, cultural centers and institutions such as CONACULTA give workshops and sponsor events such as contests to keep the craft viable. The parish of San Pedro Apostol in Tepotzotlan has an annual event dedicated to promoting cartonería among youth in preparation for Day of the Dead. Creaturas de Papel, headed by Nancy Chávez and Gabriel Granados, is a workshop for cartonería in Tepotzotlan. Its work has been presented in venues such as the Popular Culture Museum of Toluca and at the Festival de las Almas in Valle de Bravo.

While cartonería figures such as piñatas, alebrijes and skeletons are well-known, one type of figure, dolls has not maintained it popularity as much. The Miss Lupita project was founded by artista Carolina Esparragoza of Mexico City to rescue and promote the making of dolls of cartonería as well as other figures such as lucha libre figures, mermaids, and even Godzillas. The project involves a number of artisans in Mexico which make, promote and give workshops on the making of these doll figures. In 2011, Esparragoza traveled to Japan to give workshops and exhibit figures made in relation to the project at the Sokei Academy and the Sagio Plaza Gallery in Tokyo.

== Piñatas ==
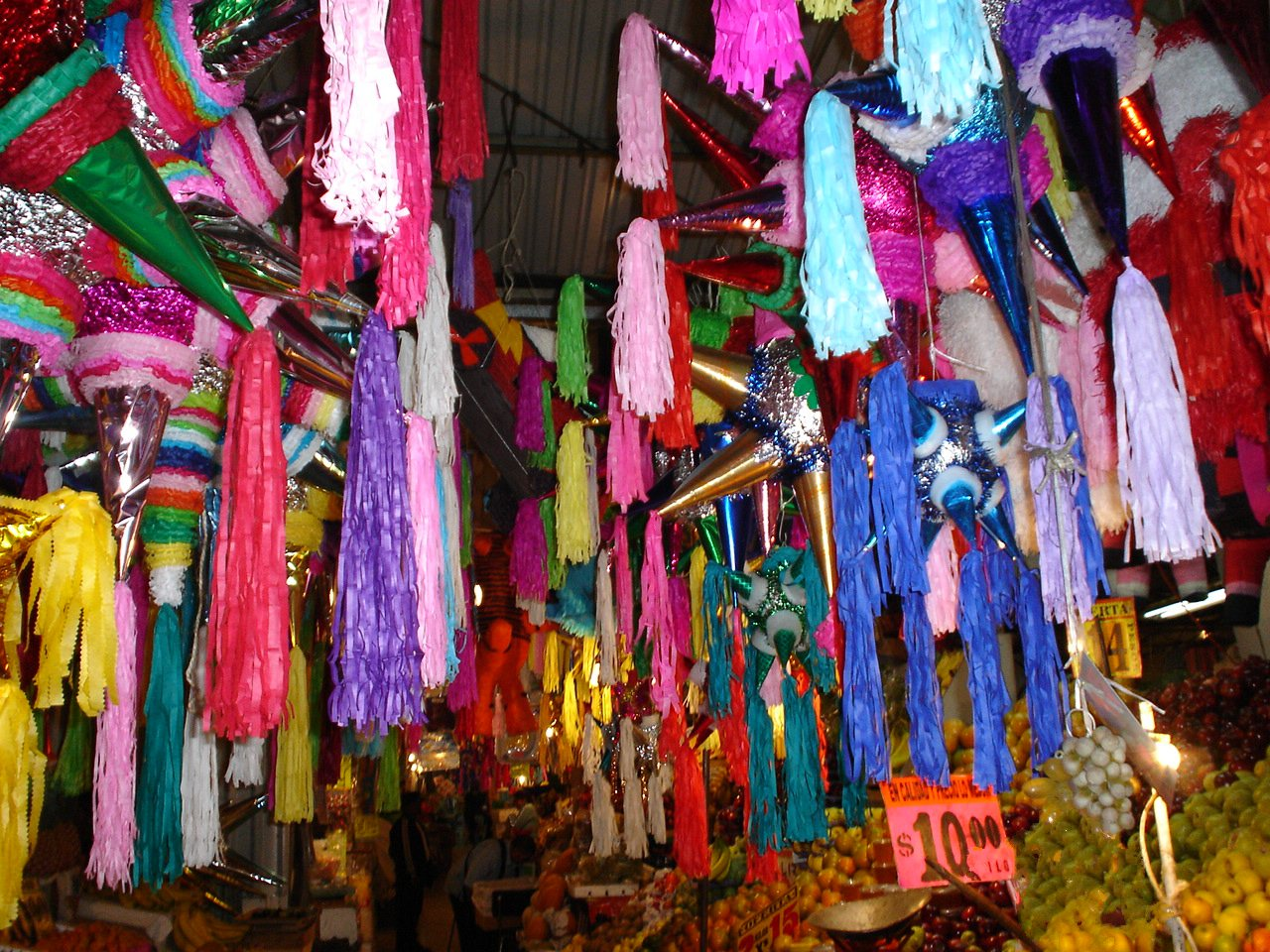
Piñatas hanging in a traditional Mexican market

While piñatas are found at parties year round, they are most traditional for the Christmas season, especially during the weeks prior when "posadas" are celebrated. These posadas reenact the search of Joseph and Mary for a place to stay before giving birth to Jesus. The piñata came to Mexico from Europe during the colonial period, although the practice of breaking a container with treats inside originated in Asia. In Mexico, the tradition is that of an old pot with decorations with seasonal fruit, candy and other prizes for children, with these children taking turns to try and break the piñatas while blindfolded. Today, most piñatas are made with cartonería and decorated with crepe paper and other items. The most traditional shape is that of a star with five to nine points. However, for other occasions, such as birthdays, piñatas often are the shape of animals, clowns and figures from popular culture.

== Burning of Judas ==
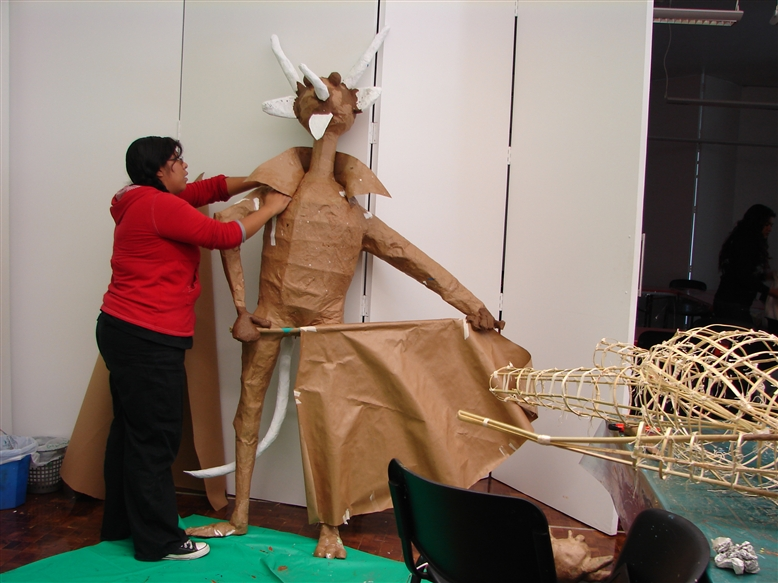
Judas figure in progress

One of the more important traditions associated with cartonería in Mexico is that of the Burning of Judas on Holy Saturday. This began in the colonial period, with two possible origins. The first says it came with the Spanish, more specifically by the Franciscan friars for evangelization purposes. The second says it began as a parody of the executions held by the Inquisition, with cartonería dolls given to children as representing heretics. The Judas are hollow figures of cardboard and papier-mâché which are usually larger than life size and can be as large as three to four meters tall. They generally have a wicker frame, painted in bright colors with fireworks attached to various parts of the body. These are set off to burn the figure and to express anger towards Judas Iscariot for his betrayal of Jesus over two thousand years ago. However, these figures are not meant to be historically accurate as they are meant to depict Judas after the betrayal. They often take the same of a deformed human/devil but other images from the culture have also appears. From early in the colonial period, they have taken on political themes, starting with images of Spanish soldiers and viceroys, and later leaders such as Antonio López de Santa Anna and Maximiliano I. However, not all Judas figures represent hated people but also those who are loved such as mythological figures, those from history and artists. They can also be found in forms from popular culture such as charros, clowns, Catrinas and even famous people such as Cantinflas. Originally, Judas figures, like ones in Europe, were made relatively small and from various materials. Over time, they came to be done almost exclusively from cartonería with sizes as large as eleven meters tall.

There is one notable artisan of Judas figures, Carmen Caballero Sevillas in Mexico City. She originally created and sold her work at the Abelardo Rodriguez market when Rivera discovered her and invited her to work at his studio. Her work not only found in paintings by Rivera but by Rufino Tamayo as well. Her work today can be found displayed at the Museo Casa Estudio Diego Rivera y Frida Kahlo in Mexico City, with temporary exhibits such as the 2009 exhibition of her work at the Museo Nacional de Culturas Populares.

Judas figures are still produced and burned in places such as Mexico City, Celaya, Toluca, Atlacomulco and Ciudad Nezahualcoyotl. However, the tradition of burning these effigies, along with the many firecrackers that are on them has diminished since the mid 20th century, due to restriction on explosives. This had the effect of putting many cartonería craftsmen out of business as this and works for Day of the Dead are the two main seasons for the craft.

== Mojigangas ==
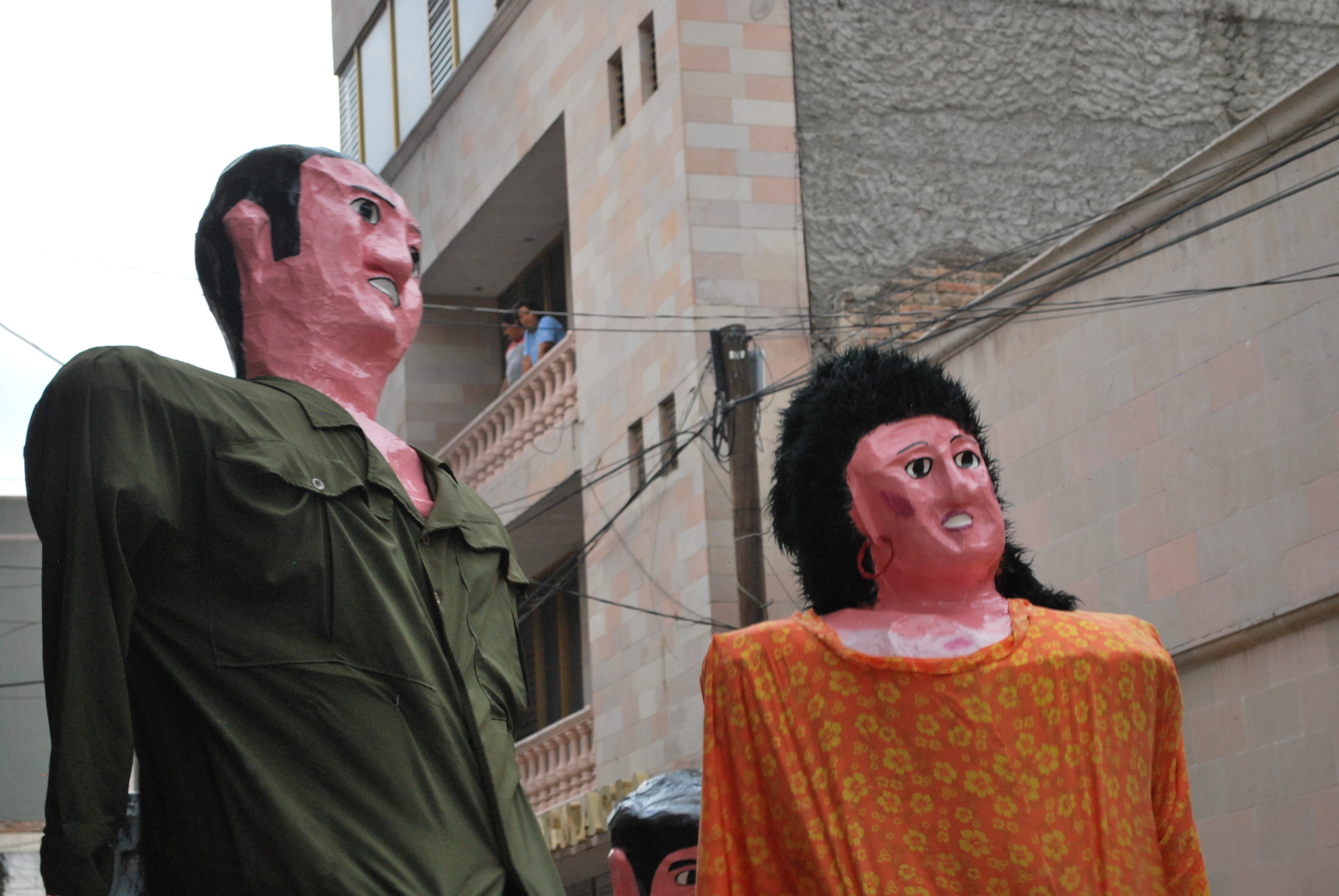
Mojigangas at a parade in San Juan de los Lagos, Jalisco

Similar to those used in traditional festivals in some parts of Europe and Asia, mojigangas are giant papier-mâché figures worn by dancers which can be found in Mexico. Like the Judas figures, these are hollow with wicker frames covered in papier-mâché then painted and decorated. The figures have oversized heads and small bodies which are often of devils, angels or male/female figures. One of the best known mojigangas in Mexico are those that are in the opening parade of the Guelaguetza festival in Oaxaca.

== Toritos ==
Toritos (little bulls) are wood or wicker frames with papier-mâché built in the form of a bull with a tall towers on its back. This tower then holds a quantity of fireworks. During festivals, this bull figure is carried by one or more persons and the fireworks are set off. Areas where this tradition is strong includes Cuetzalan in the north of Puebla state and San Miguel de Allende, Guanajuato.

== Day of the Dead ==
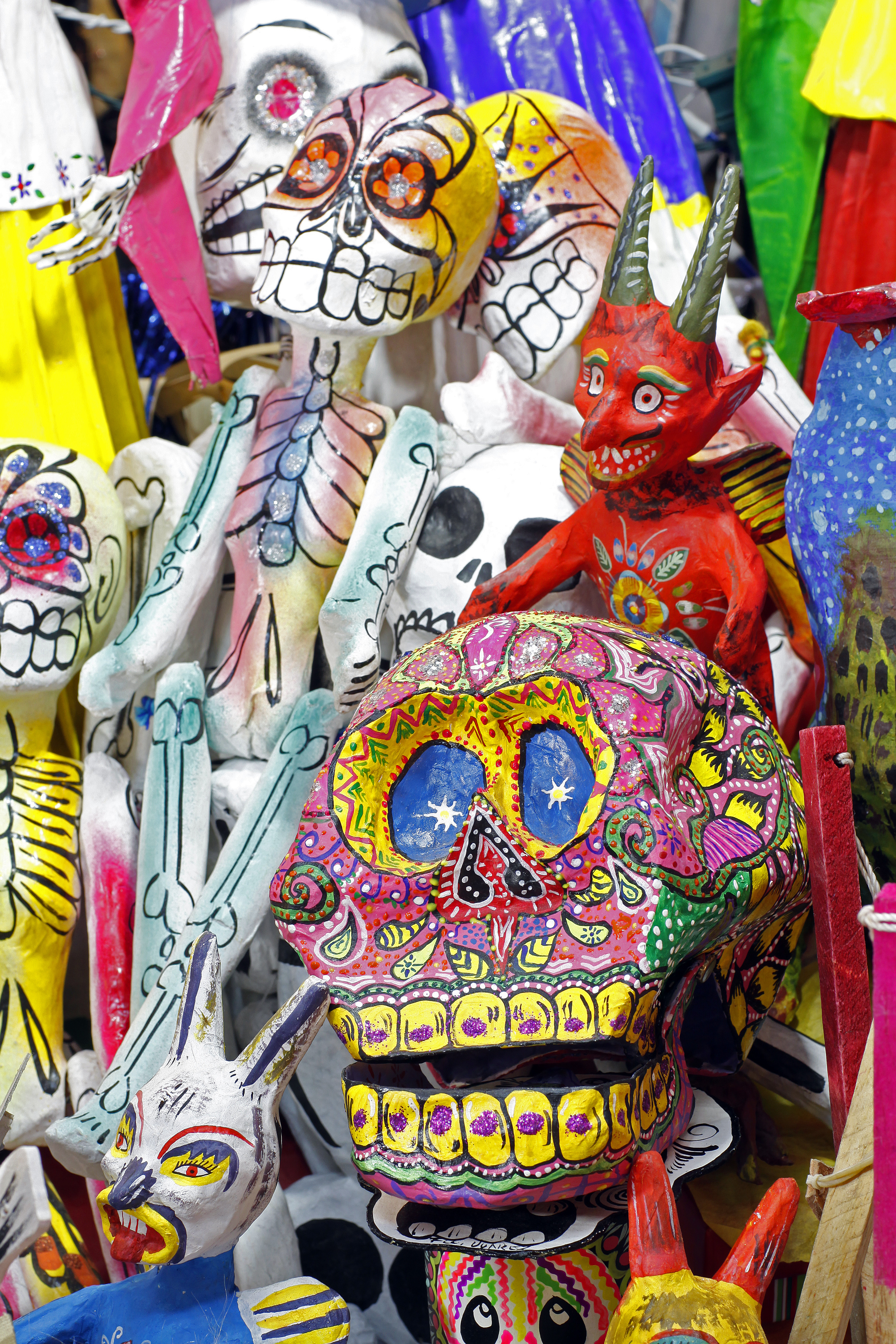
Skulls and skeletons for Day of the Dead in a market in Guanajuato

Day of the Dead creates a large demand for various paper crafts, mostly to adorn altars to family members and others who have died. Traditional markets fill with various kinds of decorations for the holiday, especially candies, papel picado and cartonería figures.

One major figure done in cartonería for Day of the Dead is the "Catrina" a skeletal woman dressed in the finery of the late 19th century. She is the creation of José Guadalupe Posada. In Aguascalientes, a group of youth called Juventud Tultepec created a giant Catrina figure of cartonería fifteen meters tall. It was created for the XVII Festival de Calaveras (Festival of Skulls) in honor of Posada. In Oaxaca and the State of Mexico, "entierritos" (little buried ones) are small figures often of monks, made of paper with chickpea heads. These are placed in small coffins of cardboard. Other similar figures include cardboard coffins with a skull that rises when a string is pulled. In Celaya, skull masks of different shapes and sizes are popular as well as skeletal figures which move similar to that of a marionette, often with a guitar or riding a skeletal horse. Cartonería made by Mexico City's Linares family plays a large part in the large altar for Day of the Dead at the Dolores Olmedo Museum, which is set up to honor the museum's namesake along with Diego Rivera and Frida Kahlo. The restaurant chain El Bajio sponsors a giant Day of the Dead altar in its flagship restaurant in Azcapotzalco which features cartonería with representations of the various regions of the country.

== The Linares family and alebrijes ==
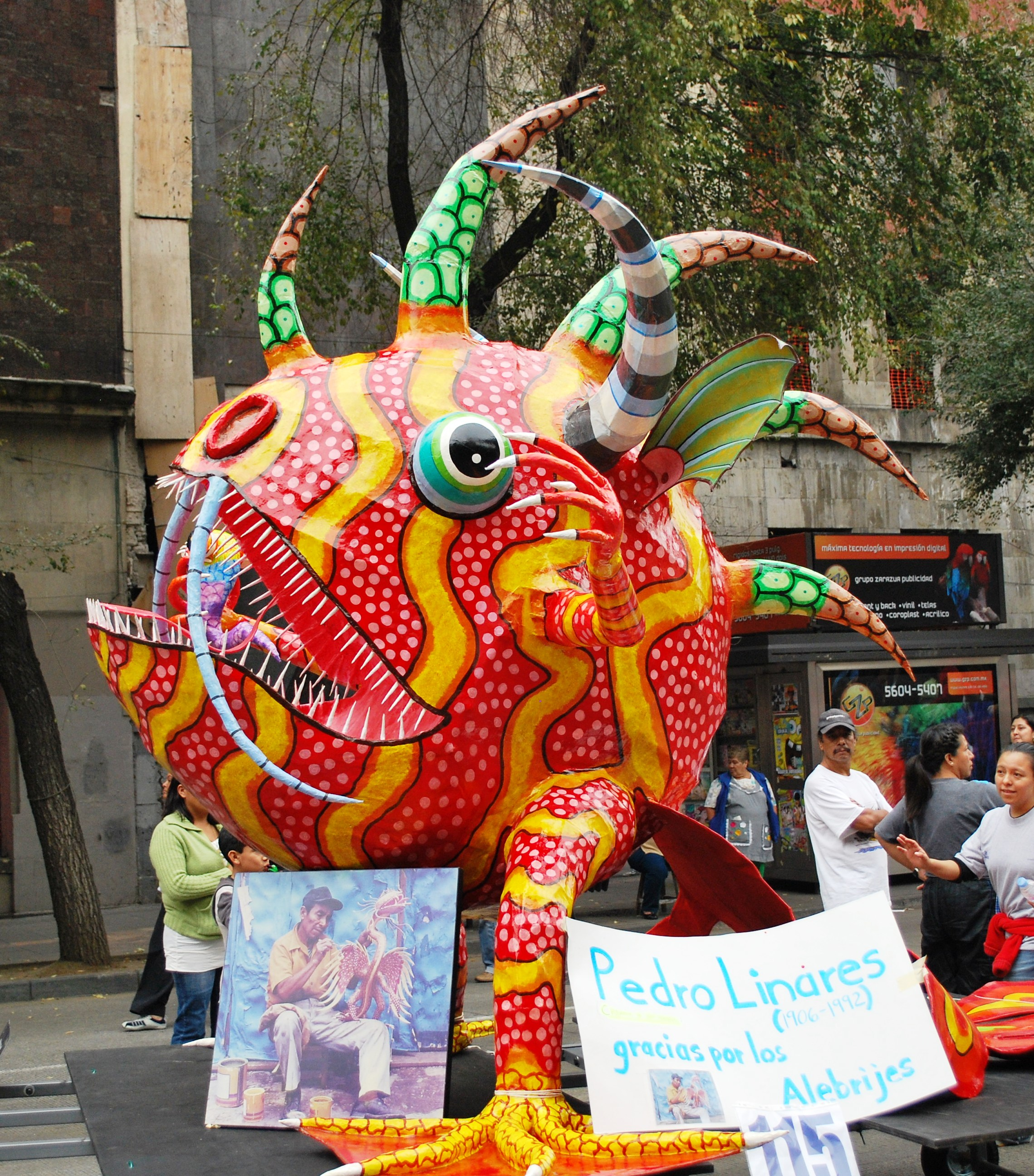
Entry in the annual Mexico City monumental alebrije parade dedicated to Pedro Linares

The best known cartonería enterprise is that of the Linares family in Mexico City, with an international reputation for forms such as skeletons, skulls, Judas figures and fantastical creatures called "alebrijes." The family's fame began with Pedro Linares who created cartonería figures as a seasonal occupation. In 1936, Pedro began to create more inventive figures including the alebrijes. The inventiveness of the work allowed them to not only sell their wares in traditional markets but they also began to sell them at the Angel de la Independencia monument in the fashionable Zona Rosa neighborhood, gaining them patronage with artists and scholars. This allowed the family business to survive the near ban on Judas figures which occurred in the city after a 1957 explosion at a warehouse. The fame of the Linares work went international as a result of the 1968 Olympics in Mexico City, when they were contracted by Dolores Olmedo to create life sized skeletal figures of Olympic athletes. While such animated figures have been common for Day of the Dead, it was the first time such was done on a large scale. This led to their work being sought out by museums and others in the United States and Europe. In 1990 Pedro Linares received the distinguished National Award for Science and Art from the Mexican government.

Despite questions as to whether the tradition would make it into the succeeding generation, not only do Pedro Linares' three sons dedicate themselves to the craft full-time, three grandsons are also involved in the family business and have made their own innovations such as skeletons depicting prostitutes, drug addicts and sports participants. For Day of the Dead in 1986, Felipe Linares was commissioned to commemorate the 1985 Mexico City earthquake. This resulted in called "La Muerte Tembloroso" (Death in Tremors) with over fifty life sized skeletons to represent key incidents with figures such as firemen, victims under rubble, injured people, soldiers and even a looter with a television set. One figure commemorates a person known as "El Pulga" (the flea) a skinny rescuer known for going into small spaces under collapsed buildings. The work was controversial at the time, but it was also used to raise money for the victims in Europe. The family continues to work in various spaces all located a few blocks behind the Sonora Market in Mexico City. The business relies heavily on an apprenticeship system to allow for a "common visual language." This allows the various family members to work on parts of a large scale order but for all the pieces to fit together as a whole at the end. The family works collectively to produce not only individual orders, but also major works for institutions such as "The Atomic Apocalypse" piece created for the British Museum. Works by the family have also been exhibited at the Centre Georges Pompidou in Paris, the British Museum, the Fowler Museum of Cultural History in Los Angeles and the Gallery of Modern Art in Glasgow.

The two most common themes in the Linares' work are the animated skeleton and the alebrije. Both are based on the forms and techniques used to make Judas figures and there are early works by the families of human Judas figures with animal heads and wings. According to the family, Pedro Linares came up with the concept of alebrijes as a young man sick in bed with a high fever, dreaming of them and the name. After he became well again, he began to create the monsters he saw in his dreams. Despite the story, Pedro Linares himself admitted that the creatures evolved over his lifetime. These creatures are often a composite of various real and imaginary animals painted in bright colors and wild designs. The creating of these creatures soon spread to Celaya and then into the state of Oaxaca, where there are carved from wood rather than shaped from paper products. Examples of these creatures can be found in various museums in Mexico including the Museo Casa Estudio Diego Rivera y Frida Kahlo as well as the Museo de Arte Popular in Mexico City. The grand scale of imitation has had its benefits and drawbacks. Since their invention, alebrijes have morphed into more contemporary forms with images from rock stars, superheroes and more. Daniel Barrera is a known cartonería artist from Ciudad Nezahualcoyotl. His alebrije works tend to be based on popular culture, especially rock bands such as Judas Priest as well as the alebrije tradition. However, the family notes that there is a serious problem with other artists passing off their wares as from the Linares family.

The Day of the Dead season is the busiest for the Linares Family, with interest in the holiday in the United States and Europe translating to even more business for the enterprise. Their animated skeletons are known for their variety with those that dance, ride skateboards and do any number of common occupations past and present such as streetcar driver. They produce multicolored cardboard and paper skulls in various sizes although the most common is about 75 cm tall. These skulls have various themes such as Don Quixote, street vendors of various types, bullfighters and figures from popular culture. They also make a version to imitate the sugar skulls created for Day of the Dead, which are profusely decorated with flowers, birds and other items. Their work has stood out for its ability to reinvent classic themes of Mexican cartonería.

== See also ==
- Rodolfo Villena Hernández
- Hermes Arroyo
- Sotero Lemus
- Adalberto Álvarez Marines
