= Hermes Arroyo =

Mexican artist

Hermes Arroyo Guerrero
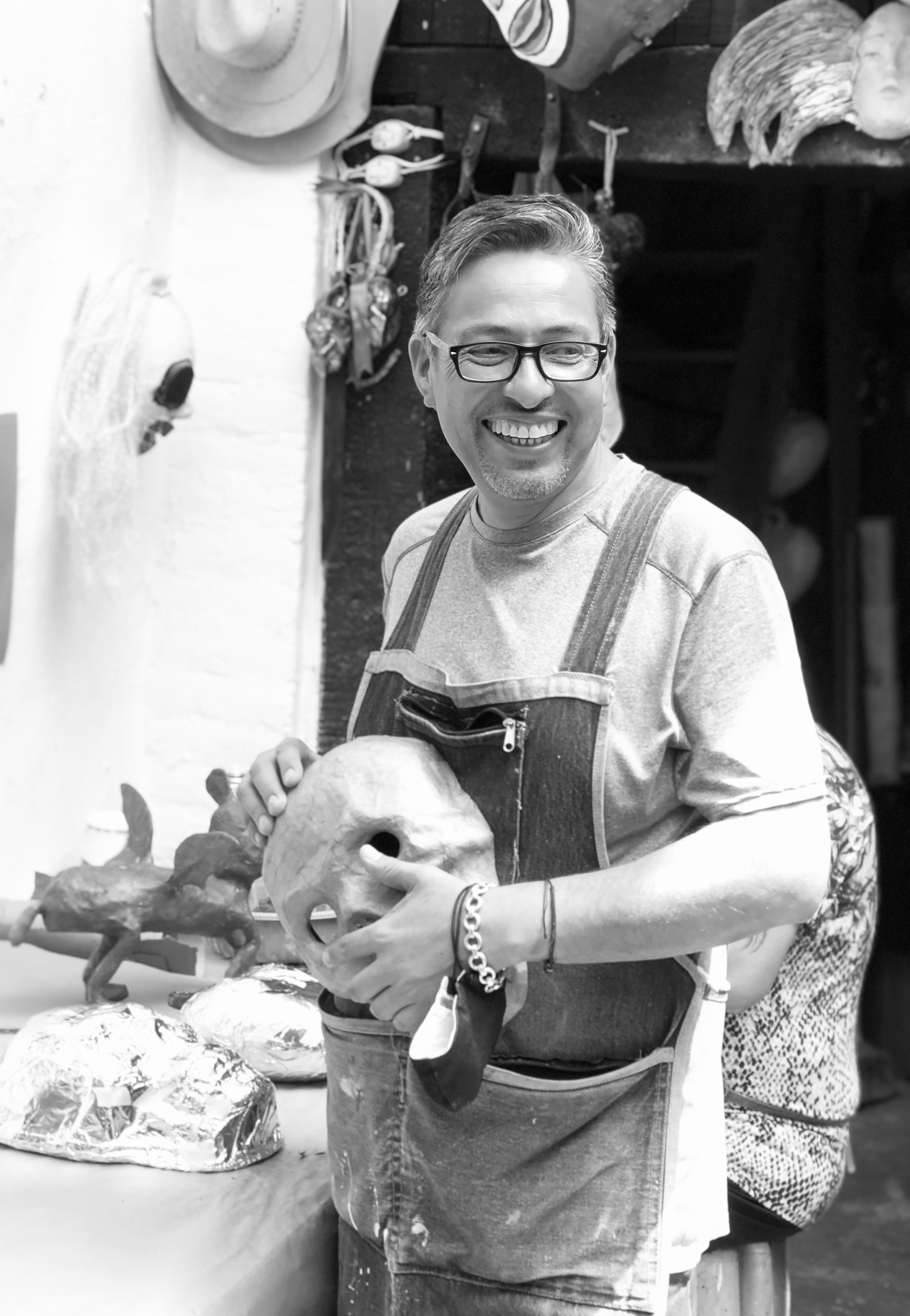
- Arroyo in his workshop at home.
- Born: December 31, 1970 (age 55); San Miguel de Allende
- Years active: 1987 to present
- Known for: Making of mojigangas and preservation of this San Miguel tradition

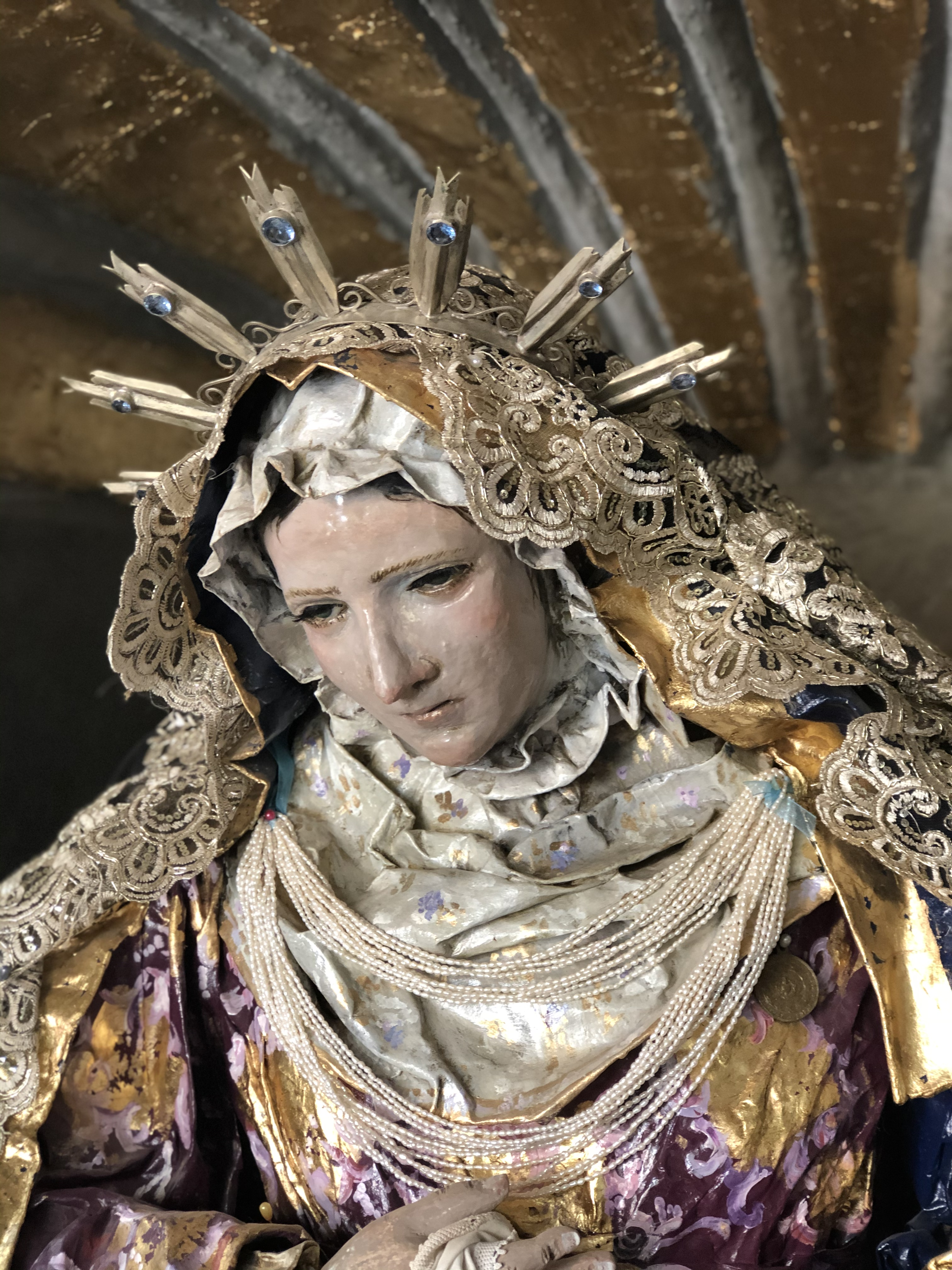
Madonna made with papier-mâché by Arroyo

Hermes Arroyo (full name Hermes Arroyo Guerrero, born December 31, 1970) is a craftsman based in the small city of San Miguel de Allende in the central Mexican state of Guanajuato. His is best known for his work in the making of giant papier-mâché and fabric “puppets” called “mojigangas” and their preservation as a cultural tradition of San Miguel. Arroyo's work has been commissioned and regularly exhibited in Mexico, especially in the states of Guanajuato and Querétaro.

== Life ==
Arroyo was born and raised in the town of San Miguel de Allende, in central Mexico. He was one of thirteen children, exactly in the middle, but his family did not make handcrafts of any kind. His interest in it came about in grade school, when a classmate name Antonio Almanza, brought nativity figures made by his father, a locally noted artisan named Genaro Almanza, who had a workshop nearby on Calle Jesus. Arroyo's fascination with the figures extended to all aspects of Almanza's work. This led to an apprenticeship with the master craftsman, as well as a familial, with Almanza becoming a godfather to Arroyo. From Almanza, Arroyo learned to work with wood, gold leaf, fabric, paint, molds, sparkles, plaster, resin and more, mostly related with the making and care of religious icons and other paraphernalia. He also worked with Almanza to mount art exhibits and creating props, costumes and scenery.

However, Arroyo's studies did not end there. He studied art at the Centro Cultural El Nigromante in San Miguel, as well as art in the city of Monterrey. This combination of training means that Arroyo produces more avant guarde pieces as well as traditional ones.

Today, Arroyo is the head of the family that produces various handcrafts, and who are still based in his childhood home on the steepest part of the Calle San Francisco in the historic center of San Miguel. One room is specifically dedicated as his workshop, filled with paints, accessories, paper, and partially completed works, with little room to move. However, his work can be seen throughout the house, both finished products for customers as well and projects to improve the living spaces.

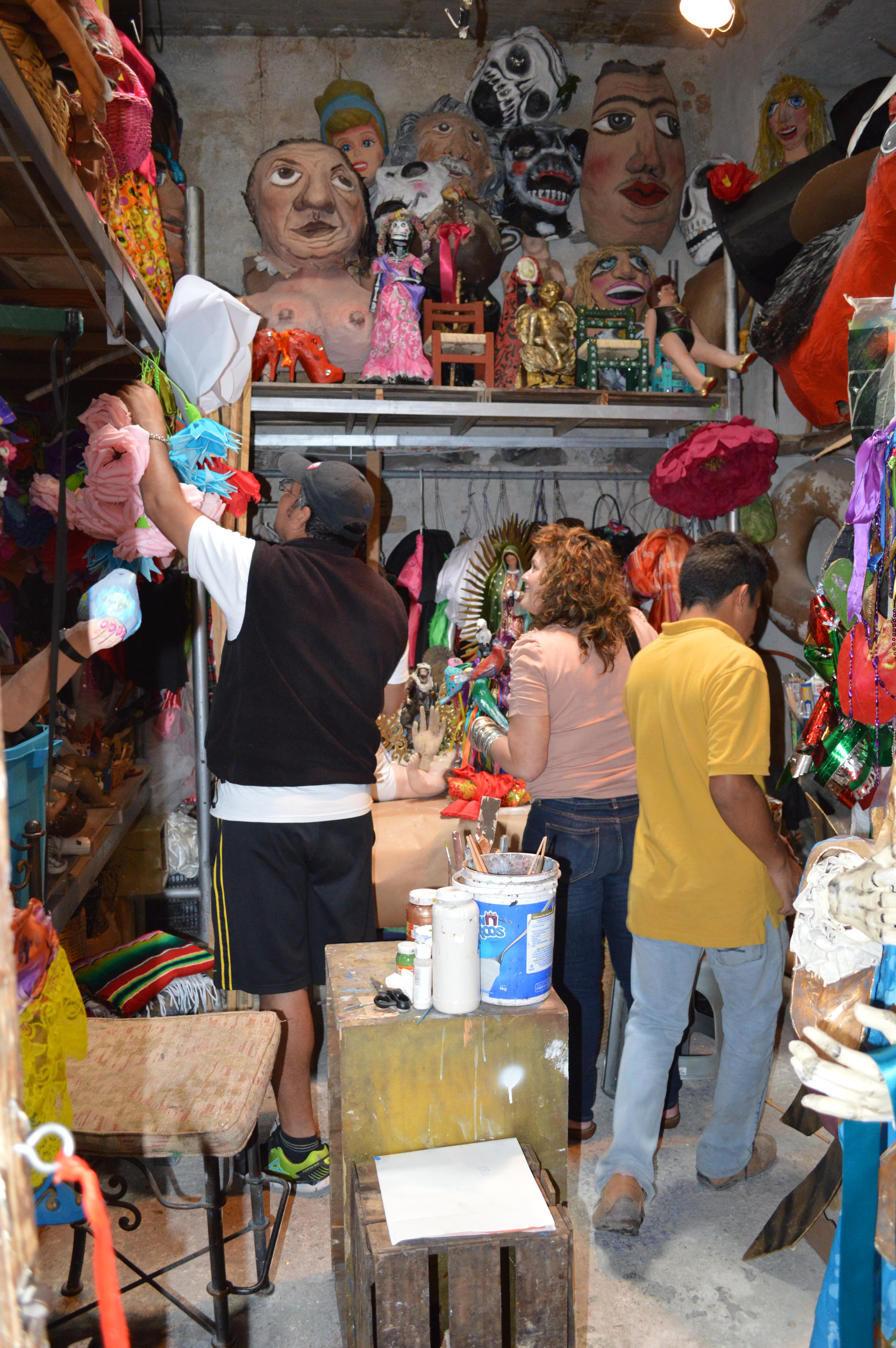
View of the small workshop.

== Career ==
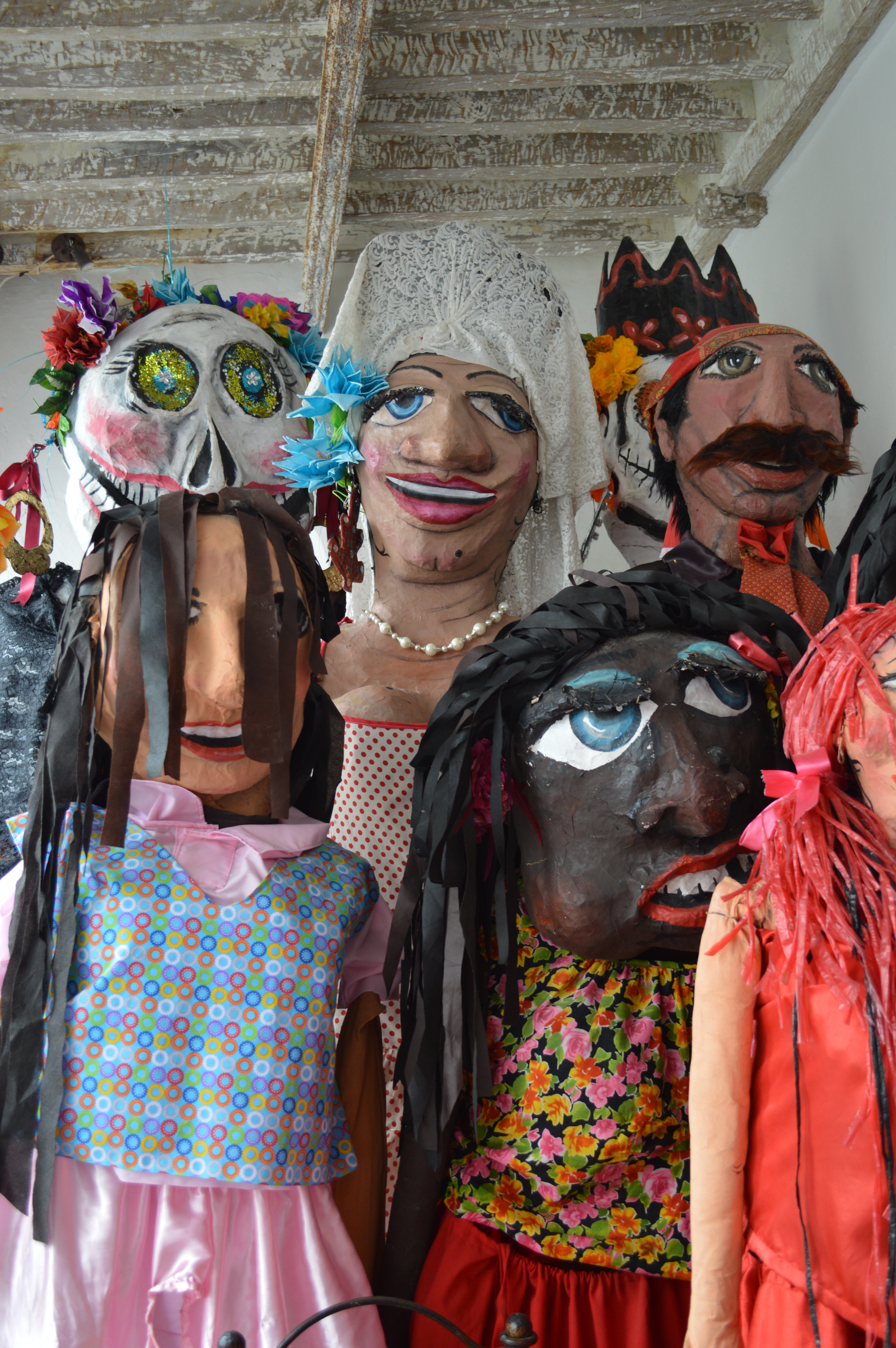
Mojigangas in the home of the artisan

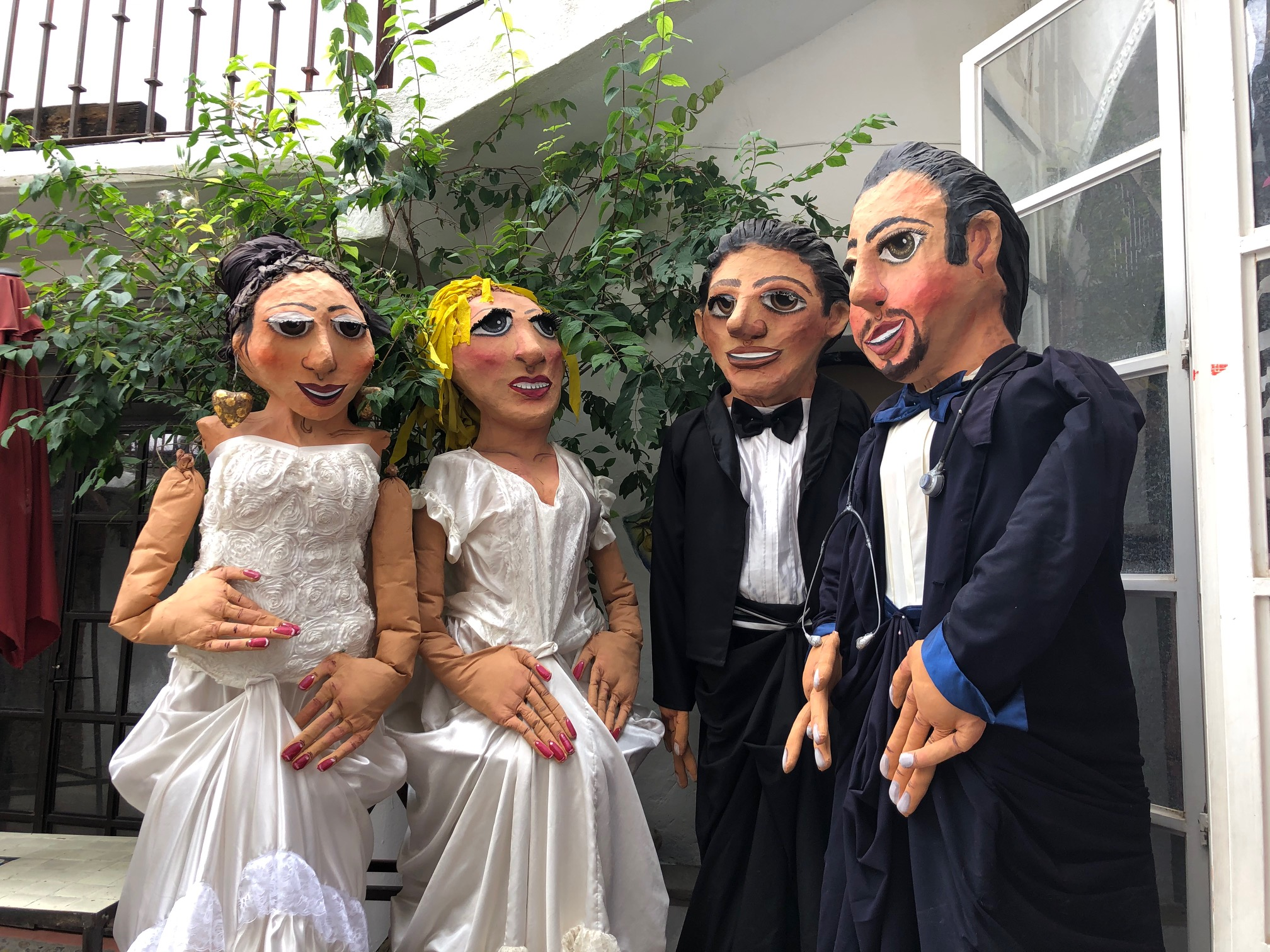
Wedding Mojigangas in the backyard of the studio

By the age of seventeen, Arroyo began working on his own projects as a recognized craftsmen, starting with the reparation and restoration of religious figures in San Miguel's various churches, then applying gold leaf to altars, becoming accepted into a guild dedicated to this work. For a number of years, he was the sole caretaker of the town's Our Lady of Solitude of the Oratorio Church, which required a significant portion of his time. Later, he became the caretaker and in-house artisan of the El Calvario Chapel near the Arroyo family home. This included a workspace behind the main altar. He took care of all maintenance and decoration duties and when not doing this, he worked on commissions to make saints another works.

However, Arroyo is best known for work which was outside the scope of his mentor. San Miguel has had a long and strong tradition with oversized puppet figures called “mojigangas.” Made of strong papier-mâché called “cartonería” and fabric over a cane or wire frame, these were introduced by the Spanish during the colonial period. These puppets are worn on a dancer, who supports the top-heavy figure with straps over the shoulders, while participating in a festival or procession. Originally the figures were religious, but today in San Miguel, the figures are generally historical, from popular culture or of brides and grooms as part of weddings... a tradition particular to San Miguel.

Arroyo did not invent mojigangas, but he has become the most important figure related to their making, preservation and popularity. In the early 1990s, a foreign resident of San Miguel and puppeteer asked him to make two for a local festival in the El Valle de Maiz neighborhood, a skeleton and a devil. The success of these works led to the creation of a three-meter tall Spanish lady figure. His first mojigangas weighed up to 50 kilos but today, they rarely weight more than 20. One innovation of his was to replace the traditional hemp shoulder straps with those made of rubber inner tubes, which are more comfortable and provide more bounce during dance.

While most of Arroyo's work and clients are in the city of San Miguel, his reputation has led to commissions and teaching work outside of the city as well. For a number of years, he worked for the Botanical Gardens at El Charco del Ingenio, which led him to experiment with environmental art, using natural materials and teaching at the summer camps. Arroyo has taught handcraft production for special needs children in Comonfort for over 20 years. He holds classes and otherwise recruits younger generations to become involved with mojigangas and other aspects of his work. Arroyo has been commissioned to work on a number of varied projects, including a 2015 commission to create a life-sized nativity scene in the city of Querétaro. His work has been exhibited regionally in Guanajuato and neighboring Querétaro. In 2016, Arroyo won a contest out of twenty-four San Miguel artists to accompany a Mexican delegation to the Vatican as part of an exhibit on religious art.
