= Sotero Lemus =

Mexican papier-mâché artisan

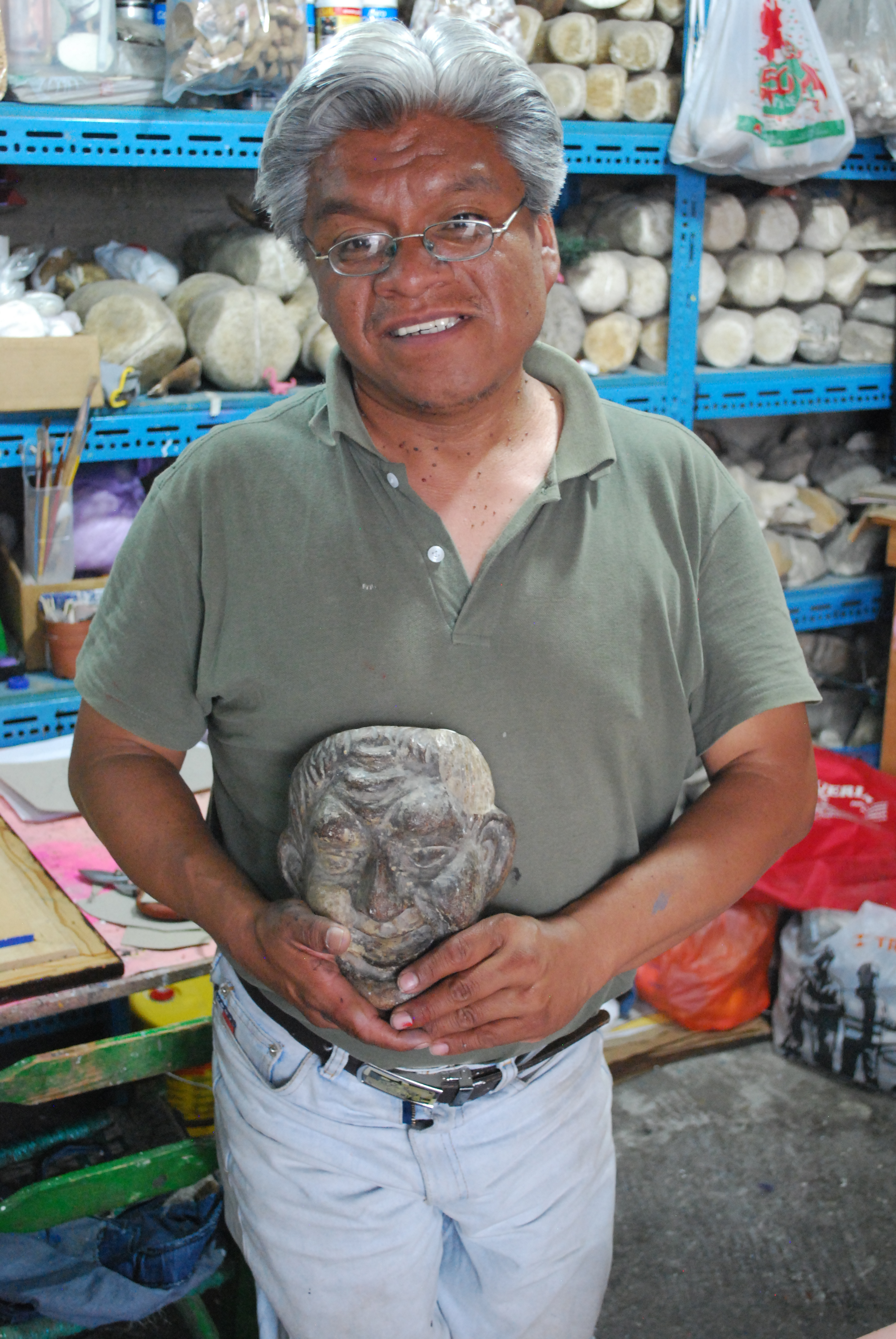
Lemus with mold at his workshop in Ciudad Nezahualcoyotl, State of Mexico

Sotero Lemus Gervacio is a cartonería artisan who is known for his traditional toymaking and large figures. Although situated in the Mexico City metro area, Lemus' work and style is based on the cartonería traditions of Celaya, Guanajuato. He is a fourth-generation "cartonero," from a family who is noted in Celaya for its work. Lemus' work has been sold and exhibited in various parts of the world, including the United States, Europe and Central America. Since 2005, he has also been involved in the making of much larger works for exhibition, starting with a twelve-meter tall image of Don Quixote on horseback, which toured Mexico for about a year.

== Family background ==
Lemus is descended from a family which has been prominent in cartoneria (papier-mâché) in the town of Celaya, itself prominent in this activity since the mid 19th century. His is a fourth-generation cartonería artisan, learning from his noted grandfather, Bernardino Lemus Valencia, who became well-known and well-liked for his work although it never translated into financial security. Other descendants of Bernardino still work in cartoneria, but Sotero's family works independent from them.

== Celaya to Ciudad Nezahualcoyotl ==
The main reason for the separation was the decision by Sotero's father, Leobardo Lemus Flores, to move the family from Celaya to the Mexico City area. Leobardo had a long history of working in cartonería, learning at age thirteen in 1949 from Bernardino and even making some improvements on techniques, keeping the traditional style. Leobardo entered the trade when it was experiencing something of a boom, just before the introduction of mass-produced plastic items, especially toys, would decimate it. It was this reason that Leobardo went to Mexico City in the 1970s, first in the city proper. He worked in bricklaying and other construction, but this paid very poorly. Leobardo and his wife, Leonor Gervasio Mendoza, who also has family background in cartoneria. decided to make cartonería toys again to sell on the side. Their success came selling pieces outside the former National Museum of Folk Arts and Trades just off the Alameda Central Park, which attracted the attention of the institution. Despite this, the pieces were slow to make and were sold for very little money. Leobardo died in 1988 at the age of 52, but not before teaching the trade to various members of the family, including Sotero, who began working in the craft at age ten, learning apprenticeship style.

== Ciudad Nezahualcoyotl workshop ==
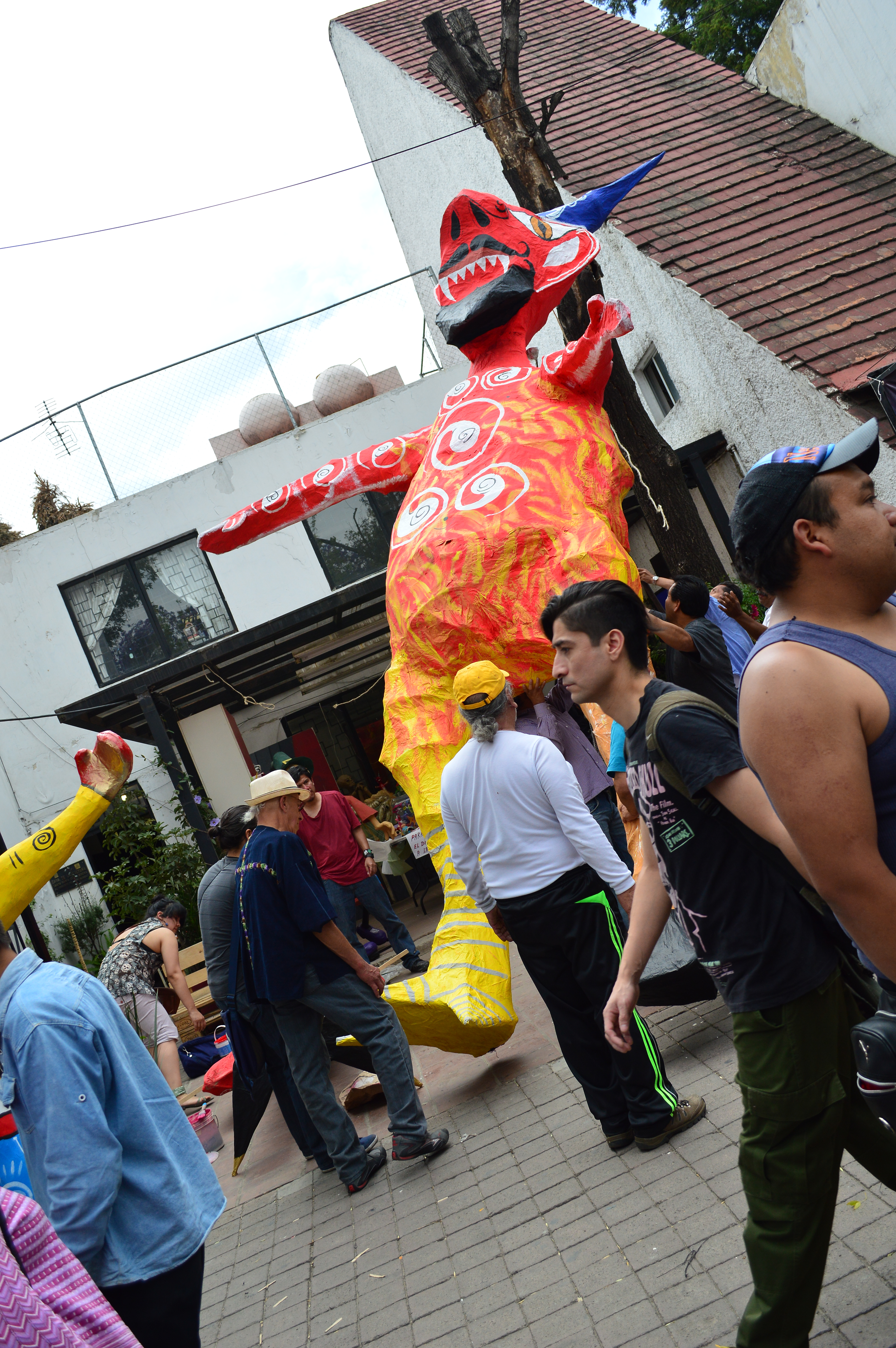
Monumental-sized Judas by Lemus and family being erected at the Santa Maria la Ribera cultural center for the annual Cartoneria Fair of Mexico City

By the 1980s, the family moved to Ciudad Nezahualcoyotl, a very poor city just outside of Mexico City proper, in the adjoining State of Mexico. Sotero continues the family business here and still works with his mother, and sister Lucia Lemus. The family house, which consists of various small apartments on two floors overlooking a courtyard, is located in the Jose Vicente Villada neighborhood. The workshop is a covered area on the roof.

He has worked to improve techniques and designs but still remains based on traditional pieces, especially in the making of toys. Their molds are either from Celaya or have been made by the family to replicate them. The workshop still has molds that are almost 100 years old, collected by the family over the years.

Sotero has distinguished his work both through his own creativity as well as expanding the family's contacts. While not abandoning the styles of the old molds, Sotero began creating updated versions, even taking classes in sculpture at the Academy of San Carlos. The improvement in the artistic value of the pieces paid off in 1987, when Sotero won first place at a handcraft competition in Celaya.

One of Sotero's contacts is collector and cultural promoter Juan Jimenez, who backed an idea to create a monumental image of Don Quixote on horseback in 2004. Large pieces are not entirely new, but before the 2000s, they rarely went over two meters tall, with which Lemus had experience. However, this project was far more ambitious. In the end, it was twelve meters tall and had to be made in pieces to be fitted together in order to move and exhibit. It built completely with traditional materials and techniques, using 1,000 strips of reed strips, seventy kilos of wire and 200 strips of wood. No glue or nails were used to attach details such as noses or ears, only paste and wire. One aspect that was not traditional about the figure was that Don Quixote was made with Mexican features rather than European ones.(lvalos) Although neighbors initially thought the project to be silly, the figure attracted attention and was shortly invited to be exhibited at several local municipal buildings, moving onto the National Palace in Mexico City and the Festival Cervantino in Guanajuato (named after Don Quixote's author). Don Quixote eventually returned to Ciudad Nezahualcoyotl landing in the custody of the municipal government after about a year of touring and exhibition. The project's success has led to various commissions for large and monumental pieces such as an installation of a dozen golden eagles (the symbol of Mexico) for the History Gallery of the Caracol Museum.

Various of Lemus's works have been exhibited in venues in Mexico and have been shown and exported to Spain, France, Germany, the United States and Central America, receiving sponsorship from non-profit and governmental agencies.

Despite the family's success, sales are not guaranteed and can fluctuate significantly. Sotero also gives classes to supplement income from sales.

== Techniques ==
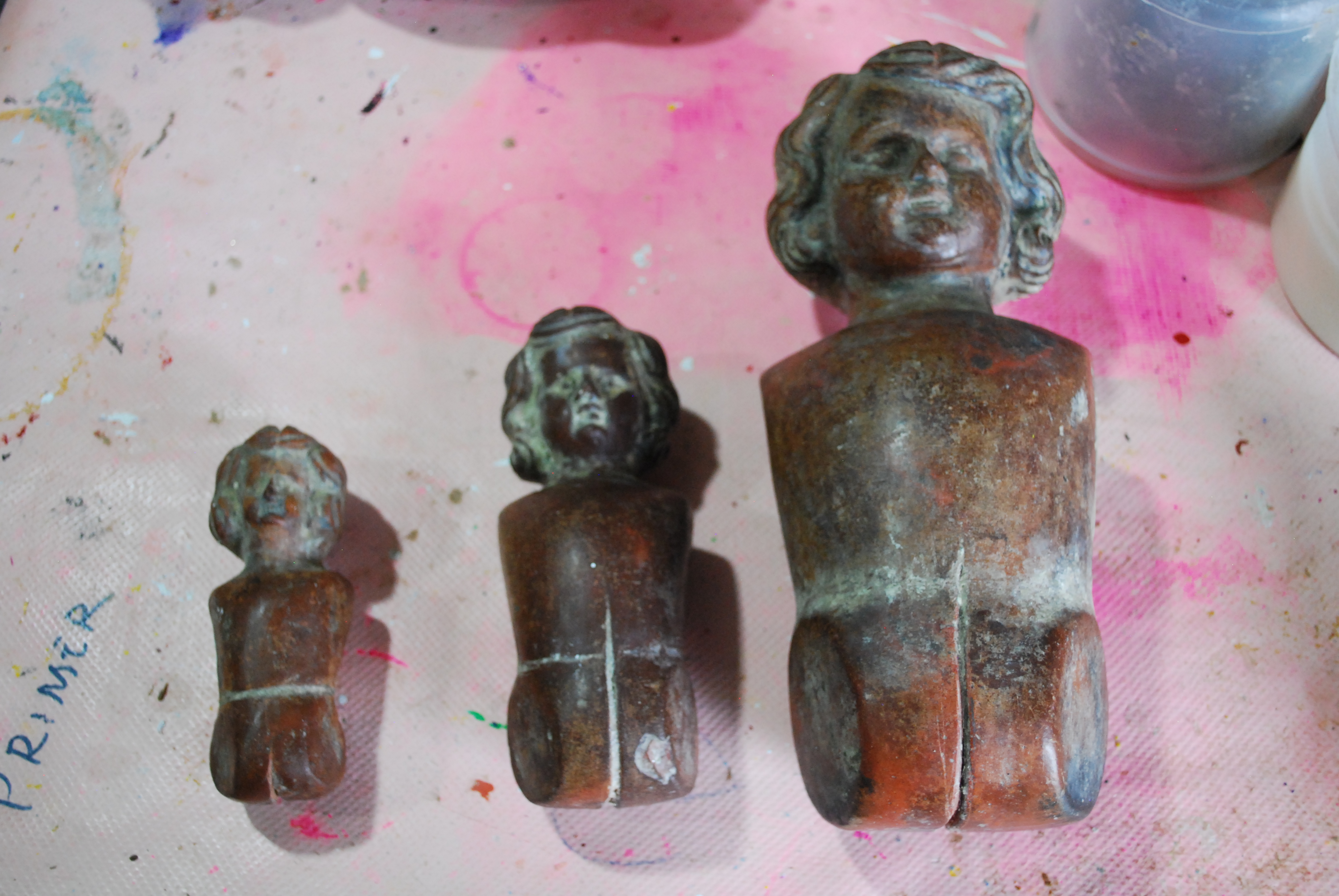
Early 20th century molds for making dolls from Celaya at the Lemus workshop

The Lemus family's work continues to be most tradition, with updating in the details rather than any radical departure from the past. The most common pieces are dolls, figures of animals and masks. Although the very popular alebrijes are accepted as traditional by many cartoneria artisans, Lemus has not expanded the family's production to these. All pieces use newspaper and or stiff paper (craft or cardboard) and paste. Pieces may have wire springs attaching limbs, particularly the head, to allow for movement. Except for acrylic paint, no modern materials are used such as plastic for decoration, which gives the pieces an antique feel, even when they are new.
