= Lupita dolls =

Mexican traditional doll

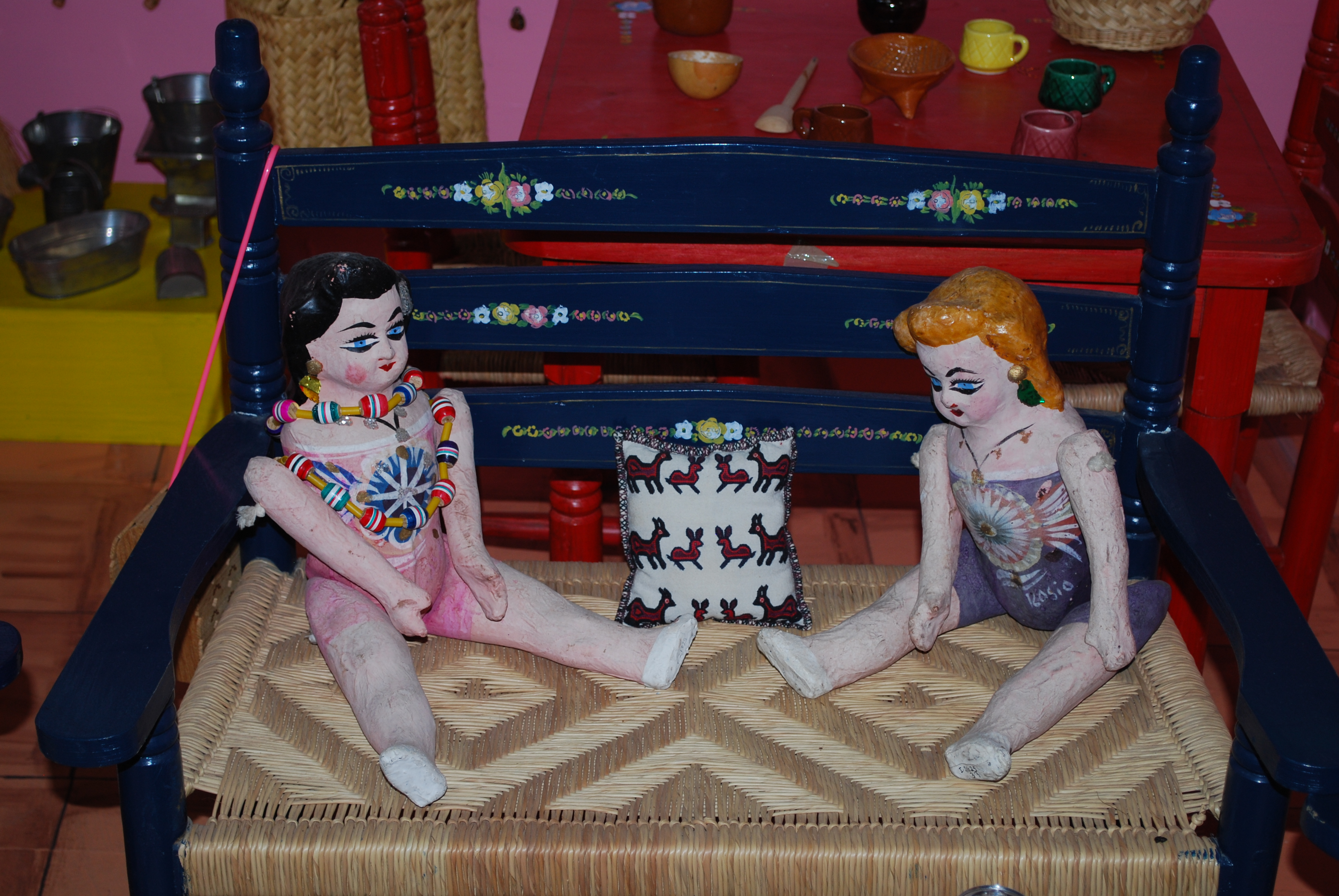
Two Lupita dolls on a toy bench at the Centro Cultural Mexiquense in Toluca

Lupita dolls, also known as cartonería dolls, are toys made from a very hard kind of papier-mâché which has its origins about 200 years ago in central Mexico. They were originally created as a substitute for the far more expensive porcelain dolls and maintained popularity until the second half of the 20th century, with its availability of plastic dolls. Today they are made only by certain artisans’ workshops in the city of Celaya, as collector's items. Since the 1990s, there have been efforts to revitalize the crafts by artists such as María Eugenia Chellet and Carolina Esparragoza sponsored by the government to maintain traditional techniques but update the designs and shapes.

== The dolls ==
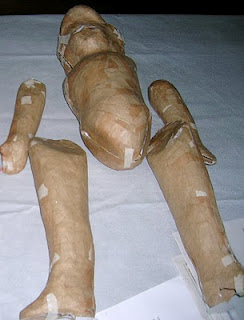
Unassembled and unpainted Lupita doll

A Lupita doll is a kind of papier-mâché doll which was made primarily by the poor along with those from straw, wood and rags. The papier-mâché technique is properly called cartonería, making a very hard surface when dry. This technique has been used to make a number of crafts up to this day, most notably to make alebrijes and skeletal and other figures for Day of the Dead. The dolls are usually created with the help of molds, one for the head and torso and others for the arms and legs, with the strips of paper and paste layered on thickly. When the five pieces are dry, holes are bored into them in order to connect the arms and legs. The two arms are connected to the body with a single cord that extends from one upper arm, through the torso, to the other upper arm, with knots visible on the upper arms. The legs are attached similarly. This allows the arms and legs to be moved from the shoulders and hips respectively. Traditional Lupitas are painted in various flesh tones and with other colors to simulate clothing or underwear. On traditional dolls, flower designs of Otomi origin are also painted. Those painted with underwear are then dressed in some kind of costume.

The making of Lupitas is known mostly in Mexico City and in the city of Celaya, Guanajuato, where they are simply called “muñecas de carton” (cartonería dolls). In Celaya, the dolls are given names which are painted on the chest.

These dolls were often played along with toy chairs and tables along with play dishes. They are still often displayed sitting on a miniature chair.

== History ==
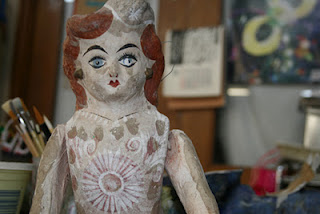
Lupita doll from the 20th century

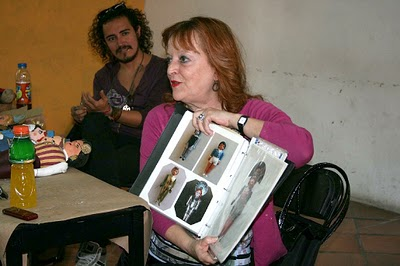
María Eugenia Chellet at a Miss Lupita Project workshop

The hard papier-mâché has its origins in the late colonial to early Independence period, created by poorer families to imitate more expensive porcelain dolls from Spain. In Mexico City, the name Lupita is derived from the diminutive for the popular girls name of Guadalupe. In the past they were sold in Mexico City in places such as the Sonora Market, where other items made of cartonería such as piñatas and Judas figures are still sold. The dolls remained popular until the era of commercial plastic dolls. A number of stories surround the dolls. One of these is that a wife who feels that her husband is cheating on her would buy one of these dolls and write the name of his supposed mistress to let him know that she knew. Another story says that they were used in the past to advertise brothels in Mexico City with each doll representing a prostitute. The dolls in the windows indicated which women were available.

However, since the second half of the 20th century, the dolls have lost popularity. They are no longer made in Mexico City and are only available from certain artisans in Celaya, sold not as toys but as collector's items. These artisans include Lupita Hernández and Luis Alberto Canchola who makes the dolls in various sizes.

Since the 1990s, there have been efforts by the government to revitalize the craft. One of these was the Jugar a las Muñecas. De las Lupes a las Robóticas project managed by artist María Eugenia Chellet from 1991 to 2008. It worked to create innovation in the dolls, creating images from mass media, the circus, harlequins, and animal/human figures. The dolls were painted in acrylics and decorated with items such as clothing, beads, feathers, ribbons and more. The main goal of the project was to see the dolls not as anonymous handcrafts but rather as works of art. This project was sponsored by CONACULTA and had workshops and exhibitions in various parts of Mexico. This was followed in 2010 by the Miss Lupita project headed by Caroline Esparragoza in Mexico City, with support from Chellet and the Fondo Nacional para las Artes y Cultura. The goal of this project is to preserve the traditional techniques to make the dolls but to update the designs. Dolls were created by ordinary people with help from artisans and artists and the results were exhibited in Mexico, Japan and Portugal. There was even a workshop to make the dolls in Japan.

Cartonería in Celaya has made something of a comeback, including the making of the Lupita dolls.
