= Museo de Arte Popular =

Museum in Mexico City, Mexico

Coordinates: 19°26′1.77″N 99°8′46.84″W

Popular Art Museum
- Museo de Arte Popular
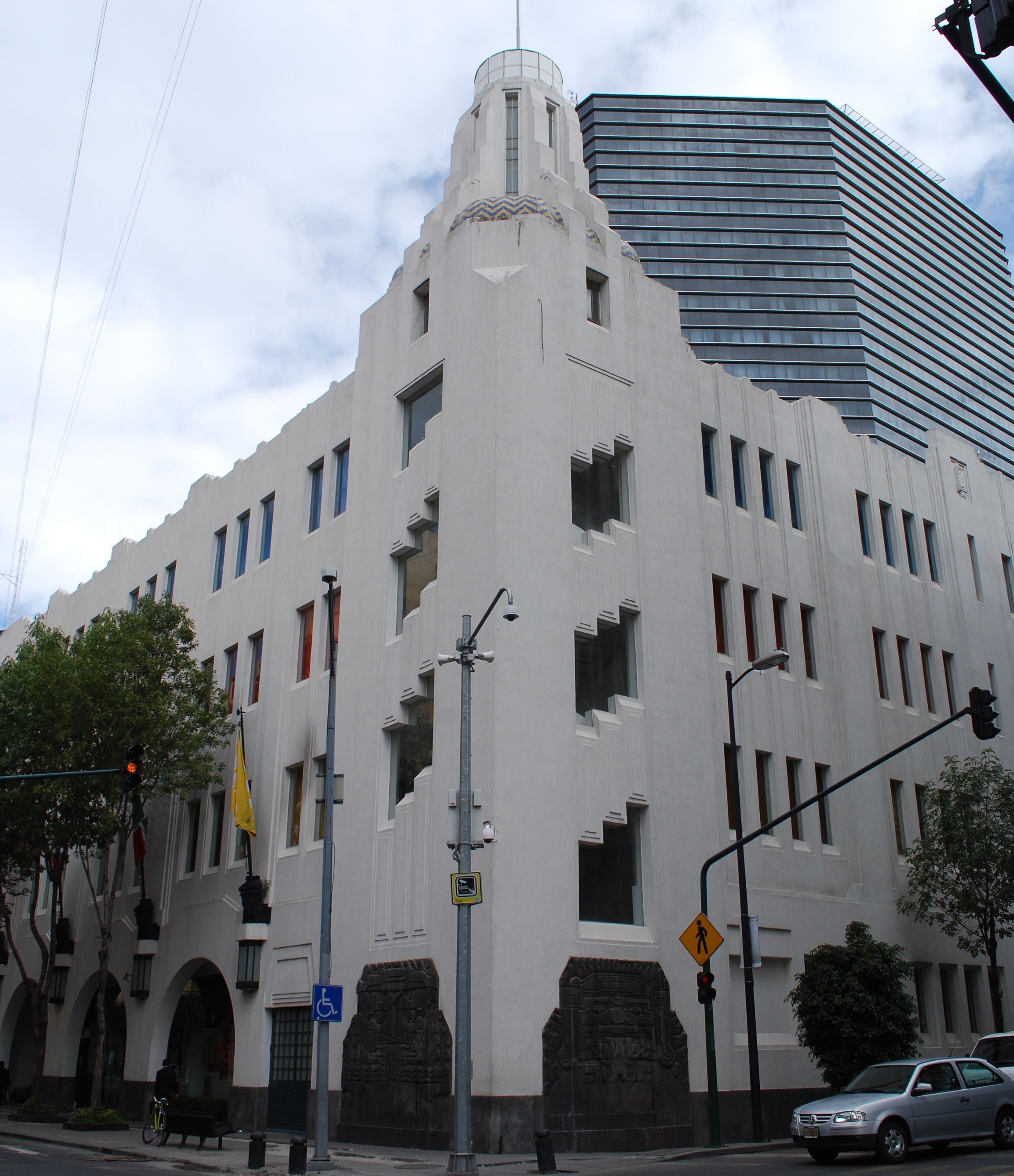
- Director: Walther Boelsterly Urrutia
- Website: www.map.df.gob.mx

The Museo de Arte Popular (Museum of Folk Art) is a museum in Mexico City, Mexico, that promotes and preserves part of the Mexican handcrafts and folk art. Located in the historic center of Mexico City in an old fire house, the museum has a collection which includes textiles, pottery, glass, piñatas, alebrijes, furniture and much more. However, the museum is best known as the sponsor of the yearly Noche de Alebrijes (Night of the Alebrijes) parade in which the fantastical creatures are constructed on a monumental scale and then paraded from the main plaza or Zocalo to the Angel of Independence monument, competing for prizes.

== The museum ==
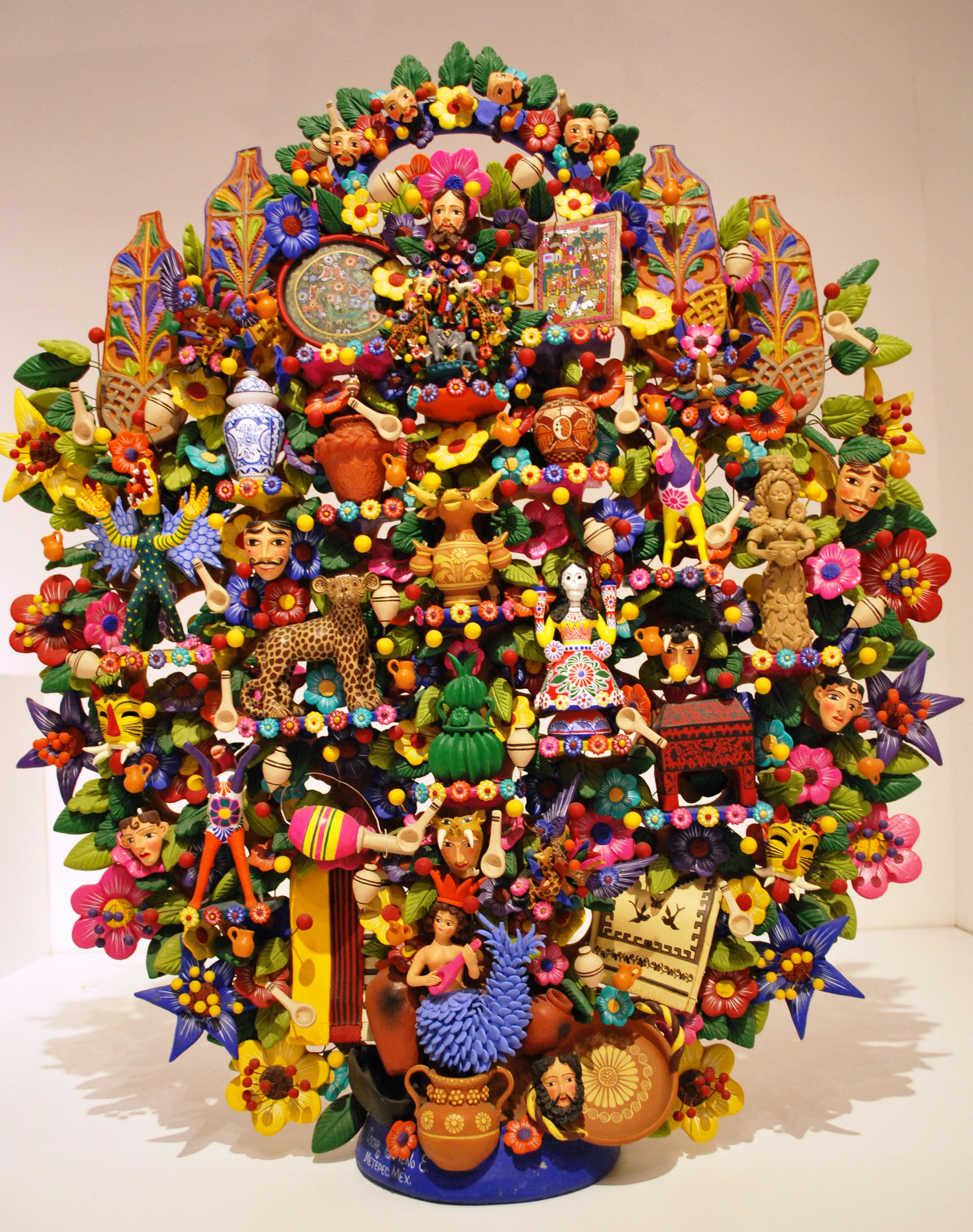
Tree of life whose theme is crafts. Sculpture display at the Museum de Artes Populares in Mexico City by Oscar Soteno.

The Museo de Arte Popular opened in March 2006. Its purpose is to serve as a reference for Mexican crafts as well as promoting them through workshops, and other events to both Mexico and foreign tourism. and dignify Mexican crafts though restoration of older works and the promotion of their creation both inside and outside the museum itself.

The permanent collection contains both older and newer craft pieces from the various traditions that make up Mexican culture. The collection was gathered through the generosity of individual donors. Some of the principal private donors include Alfonso Romo of Grupo Savia, who had promoted crafts for a number of years. He donated 1,400 pieces towards the opening of the museum. The second donor was Carlota Mapeli, who came to Mexico from Italy in the 1970s and dedicated herself to collecting embroidered garments and other textiles. She donated 400 pieces, many of which were weaved on backstrap looms.

The collection is organized into five permanent halls divided by theme, and two dedicated to "grand masters" each of which contains various kinds of crafts. The five themed halls are called "Las raices del arte mexicano" (Roots of Mexican art), "Las raices del arte popular" (Roots of crafts or popular art), "Lo cotidiano" (Everyday things), "Lo religioso" (Religious items) and "Lo fantasmagico" (Fantastic and magical things). The collection fills three of the four levels of the building, for a total of 7,000 square meters. There is also a temporary exhibit hall and an "interpretation" room which has pieces from all 32 federal entities (states and Distrito Federal) of Mexico. Crafts displayed here are of many different types including pottery, basketry, wood carving, precious metal working, glasswork, textiles, papier-mâché and others. The museum also has a research center with a library and a periodical archive.

Every weekend the museum has workshops for children between six and twelve in various crafts with the aim of preserving these crafts. Workshops include those on paper cutting, amate (bark) paper and papier-mâché. For special occasions such as Dia de Muertos, workshops have included those on making Catrina figures, sugar skulls and traditional candies.

The gift shop contains a wide variety of crafts for sale from the most traditional to the most recent reinterpretations of various crafts, containing items such as furniture, textiles and toys from all parts of the republic of Mexico. The museum’s store is non-profit, designed to help artisans get better prices for their products. Many of the products come from villages in Michoacán, often populated only by women and children as the men go to places like the United States to work. Sales of their products have been good enough to entice a number of men to return home and work at the crafts.

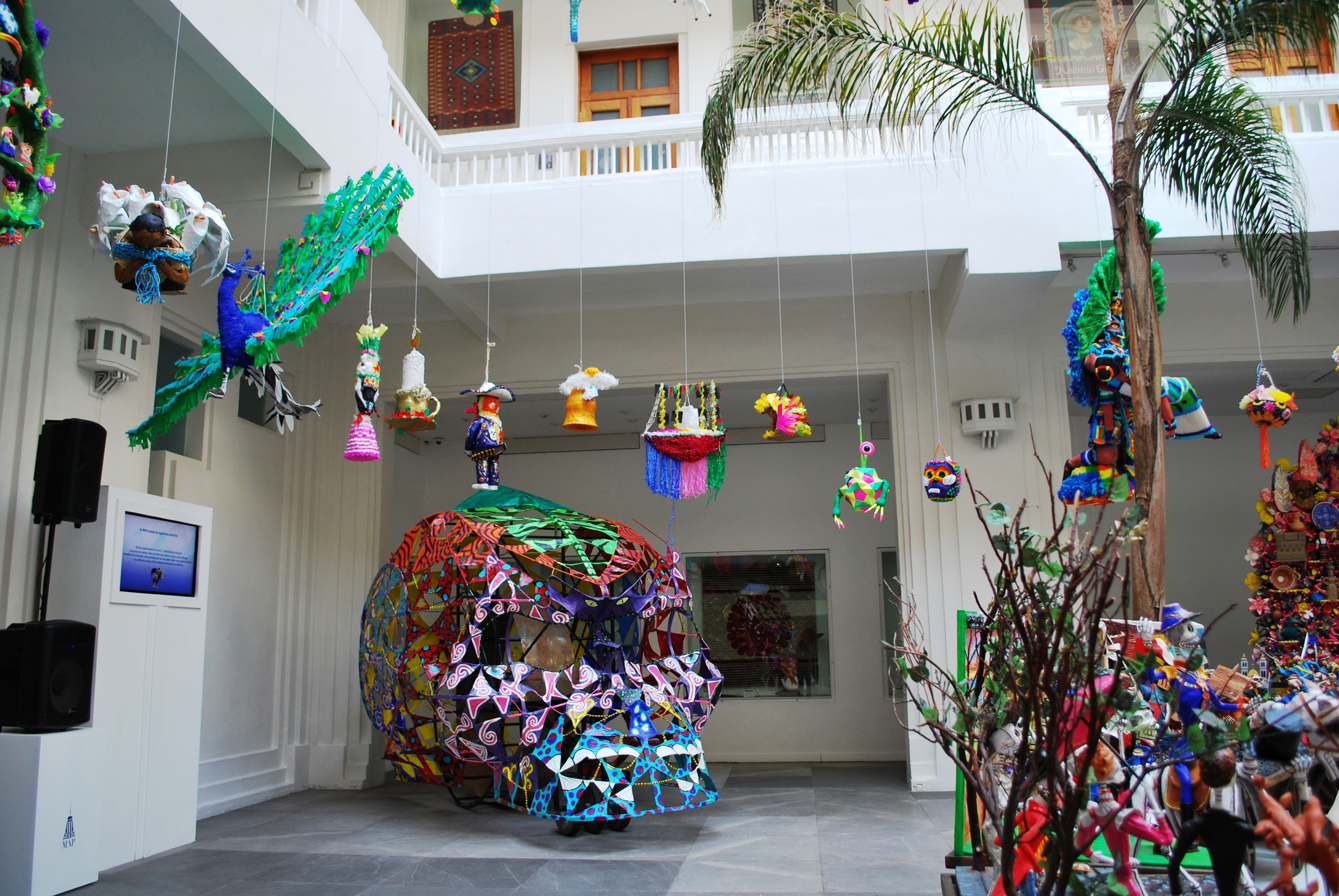
Part of the courtyard of the Museum of Artes Populares in Mexico City

The building is considered to be the second most important Art Deco building in Mexico City, with the first being the main offices of the Secretariat of Health in Chapultepec. It was donated to the museum project by the government of Mexico City. The building was constructed in 1927 by architect Vicente Mendiola as part of the government’s efforts to modernize the city’s infrastructure at the time. The building has a central patio in which the fire trucks were parked, and three floors for offices and quarters. In its exterior, it has tower on the corner facing the intersection with a light at the top to be used to signal an emergency. Another feature of the building is the relieves with pre-Hispanic motifs that decorate the facade in stone. The inner courtyard is covered by a modern glass cupola. By the 1980s the growth of the city had rendered the station inadequate and it was abandoned. It deteriorated afterwards because of the 1985 earthquake and the general deterioration of the historic center. In the 1990s, the city government decided to rescue the building and use it to collect and store a major collection of Mexican crafts. This project was given to Teodoro Gonzalez de Leon, who restored the building updating its interior.

== The Monumental Alebrije Parade ==
Lighted alebrije figures on display at the museum

The museum is best known for its yearly parade of "monumental alebrijes" which began as a yearly event in 2007. An alebrije is a fantastical creature, which usually include various parts of real-life or fantastic creatures. These not only include creatures such as flies with dragon tails and multi-headed lions, the works also carry fantastic names such as "La Mula de Seis" (The Six Mule), "Alebrijos" (combination of alebrije and "hijos" (sons)), "AH1N1" and "La Gárgola de la Atlántida" (The Gargoyle of Atlantis). Normal alebrijes are small sculptures made of cardboard or wood, painted in bright colors and mostly made in central Mexico and Oaxaca state. Monumental alebrejes are floats with the tallest one so far being four meters tall by three meters wide.

The event is called La Noche de los Alebrijes (Night of the Alebrijes) and is organized by the Museo de Arte Popular in collaboration with the Mexico City government with the support of CONACULTA and various private institutions and individuals.

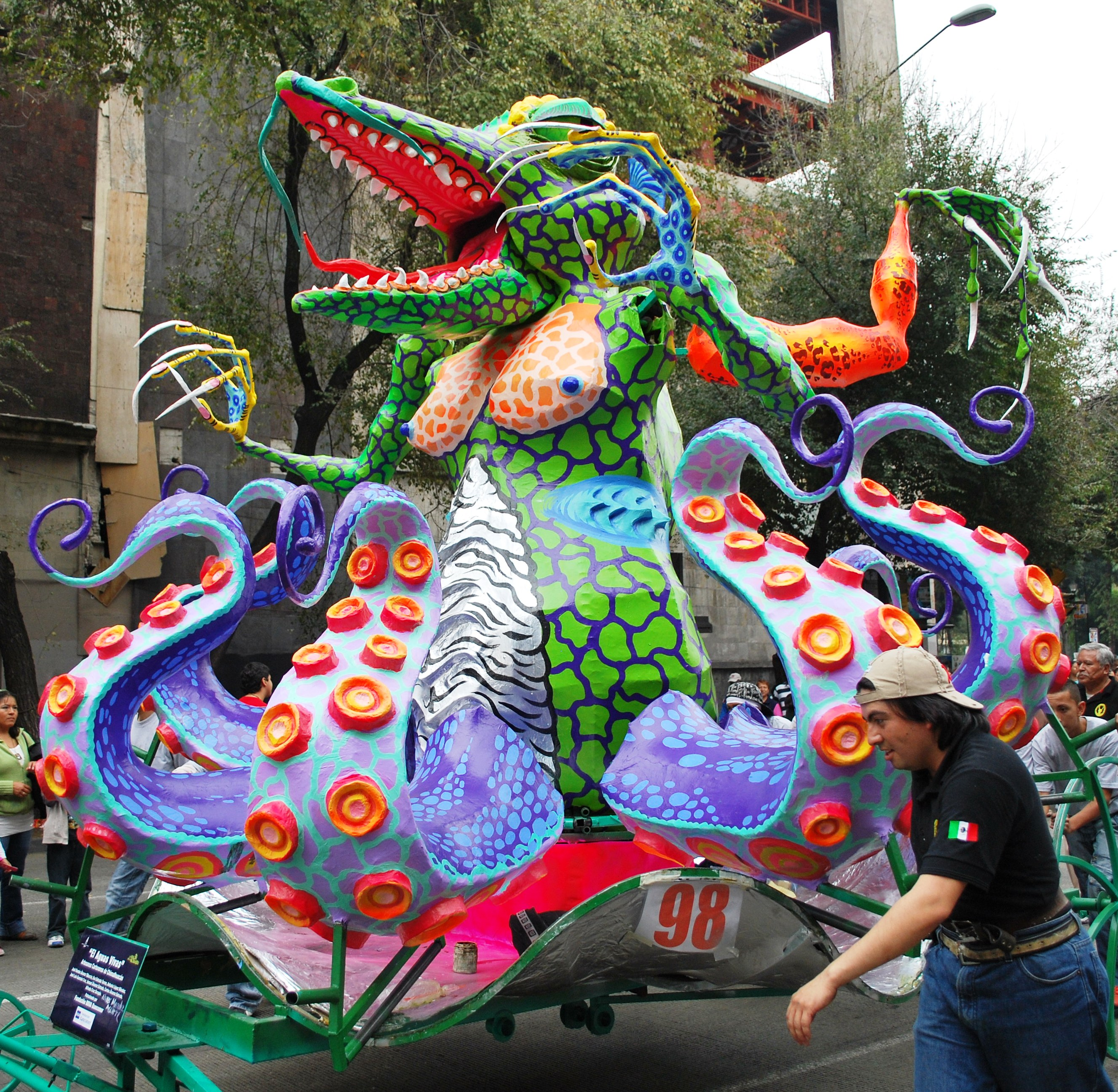
Alebrije named El Aguas Vivas at the Juarez Street portion of the parade.

The purpose of the parade is to promote the work of modern Mexican artists and artisans. The process of creating the alebrijes begins in June, with the parade taking place at the end of October. Most of the monumental alebrijes are created with cardboard except for those from Oaxaca which are partially made of wood, and wind their way from the main plaza (Zócalo), through the historic center onto the Paseo de la Reforma ending at the Angel of Independence. The alebrijes compete for first, second and third prizes of 50,000, 30,000 and 20,000 pesos. After the parade, later in the day, the winners are chosen and other events such as the Alebrije Puppet Contest and the Alebrije Short Story Contest take place.

The 2007 parade had thirty five alebrijes with 200,000 spectators filling the streets of the city center. In 2008, there were seventy five alebrijes with more than two million spectators. The 2009 parade had 120 floats registered with it, coming from Mexico City, the State of Mexico, Puebla, Oaxaca and Morelos. Marching bands such as the Navy band and the state bands of the states of Mexico and Morelos and Private bands such as El Reflejo Sinaloense, La Usurpadora, Cerro Verde and La Coqueta also participated. All of the alebrijes were newly created for the event and were designed by more than 100 artists. After the parade, the alebrijes are placed on display for about two weeks on Paseo de la Reforma between the Angel of Independence and the Diana Fountain. The director of the museum stated that each year both the number and the quality of the alebrijes have improved.

== Gallery ==
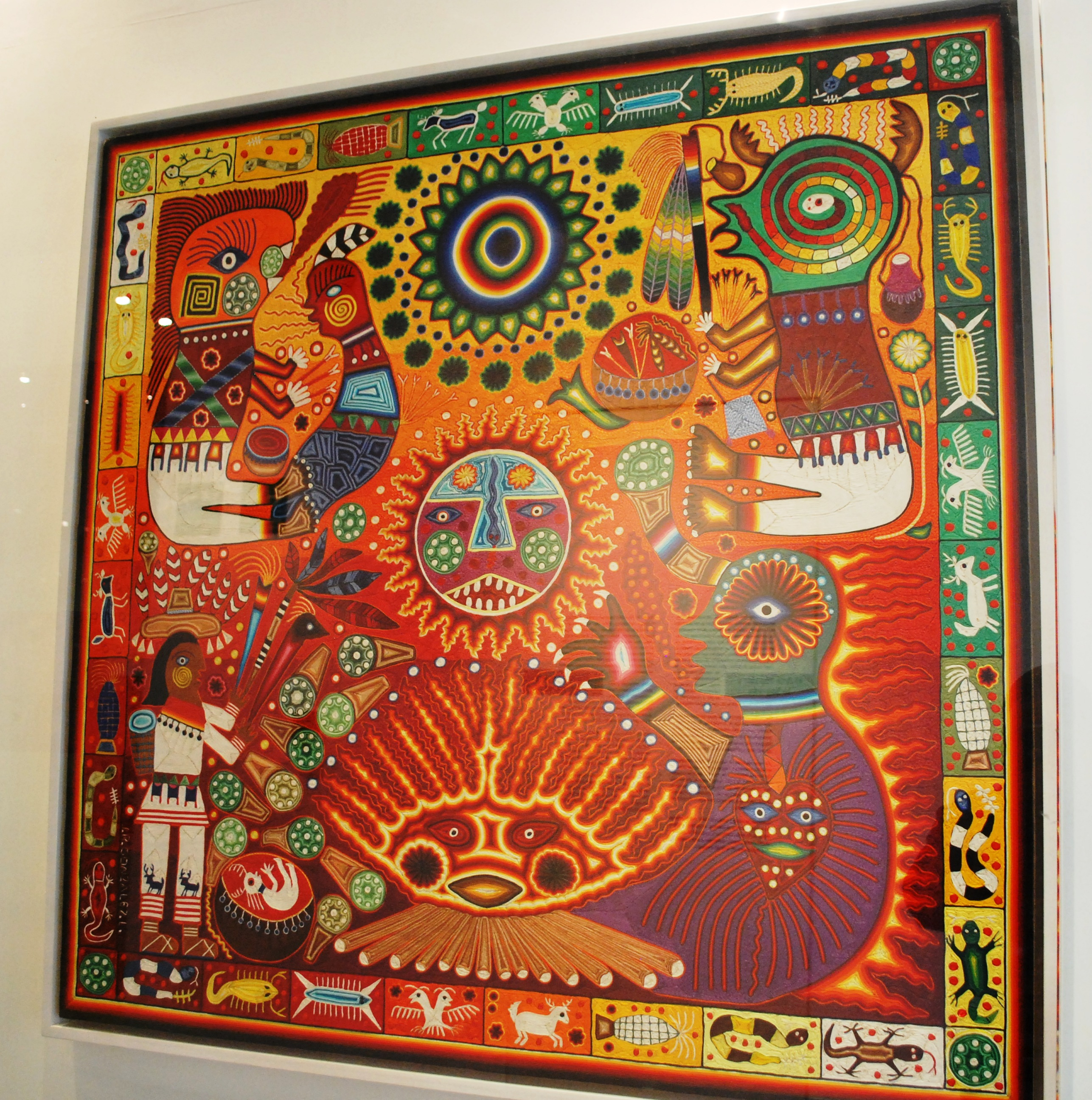
Yarn painting at the Museo de Arte Popular in Mexico City

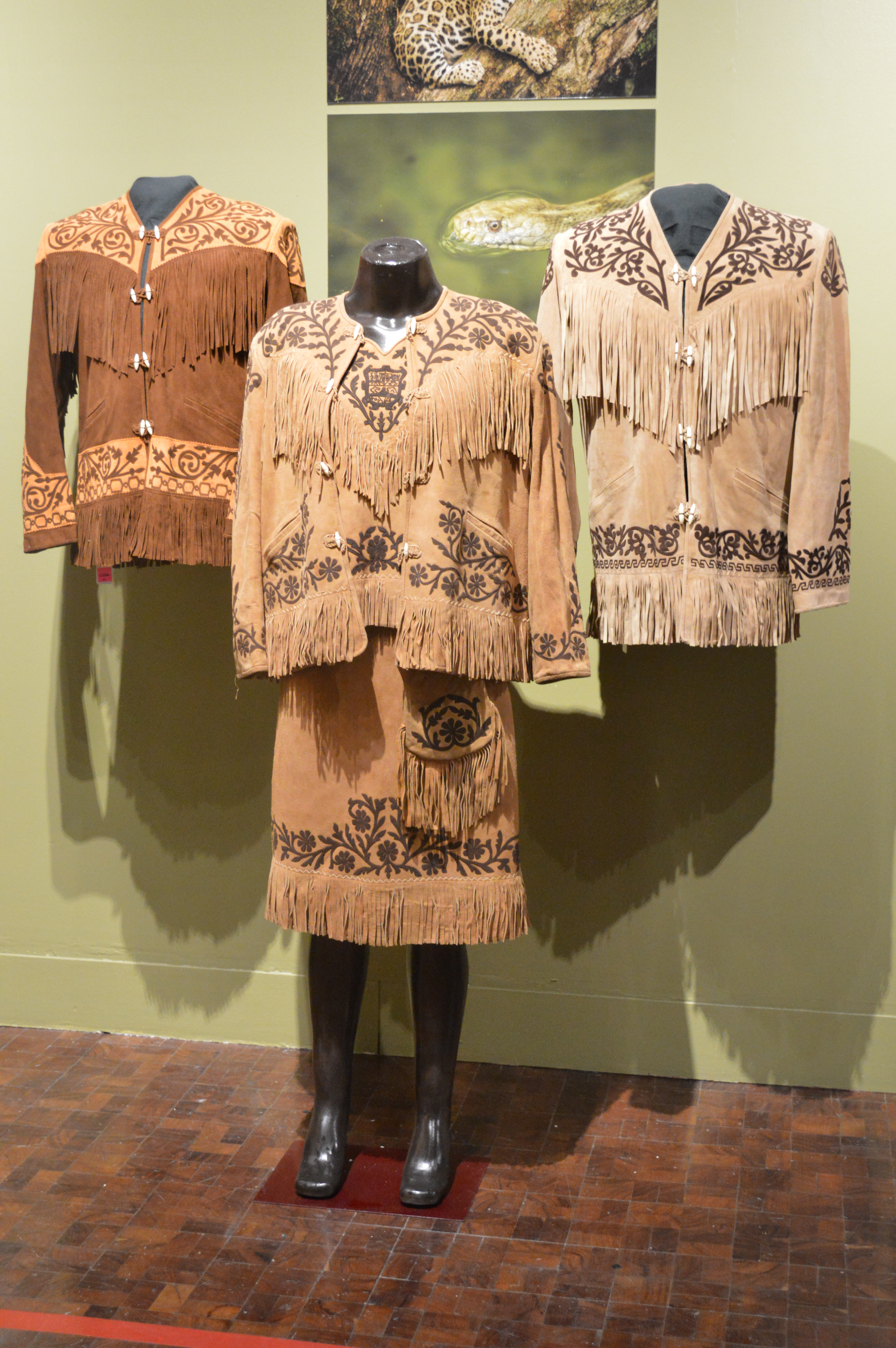
Fringed leather jackets called cueras and outfit for dancing to huapangos and sones from Tamaulipas.

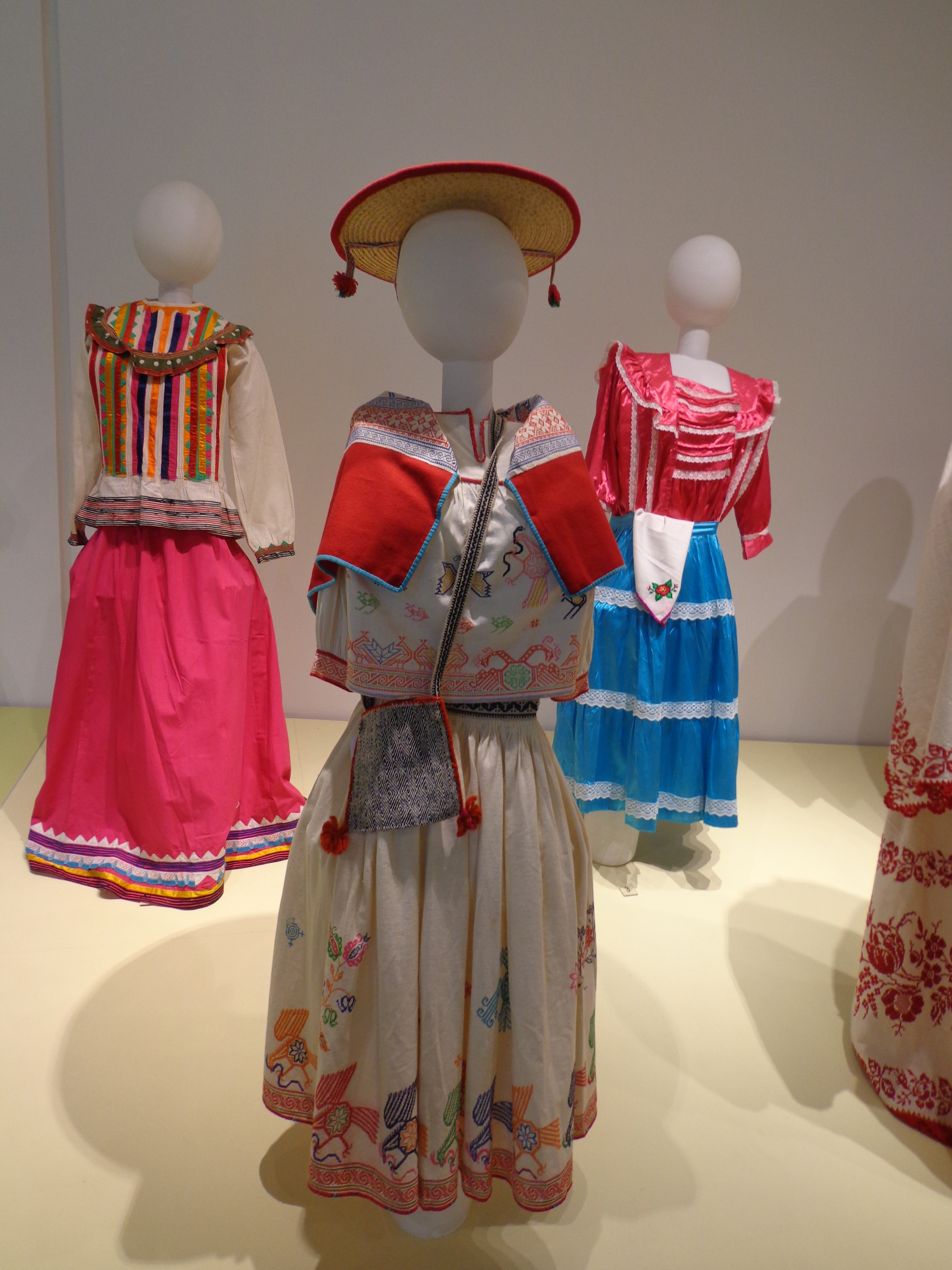
Mexican costumes on the map.

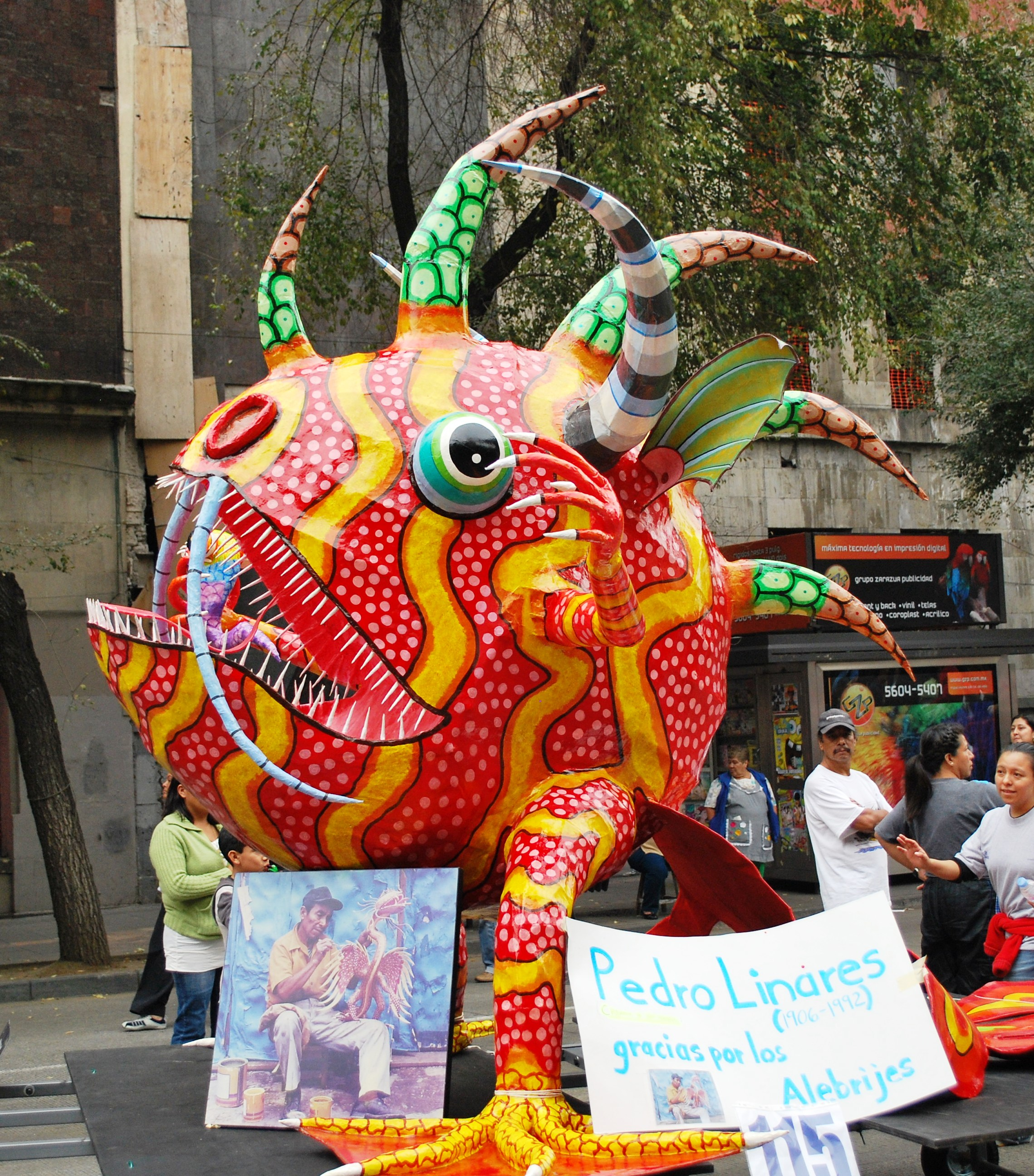
Monumental alebrije called Michin Rojo with sign thanking Pedro Linares for alebrijes creation.

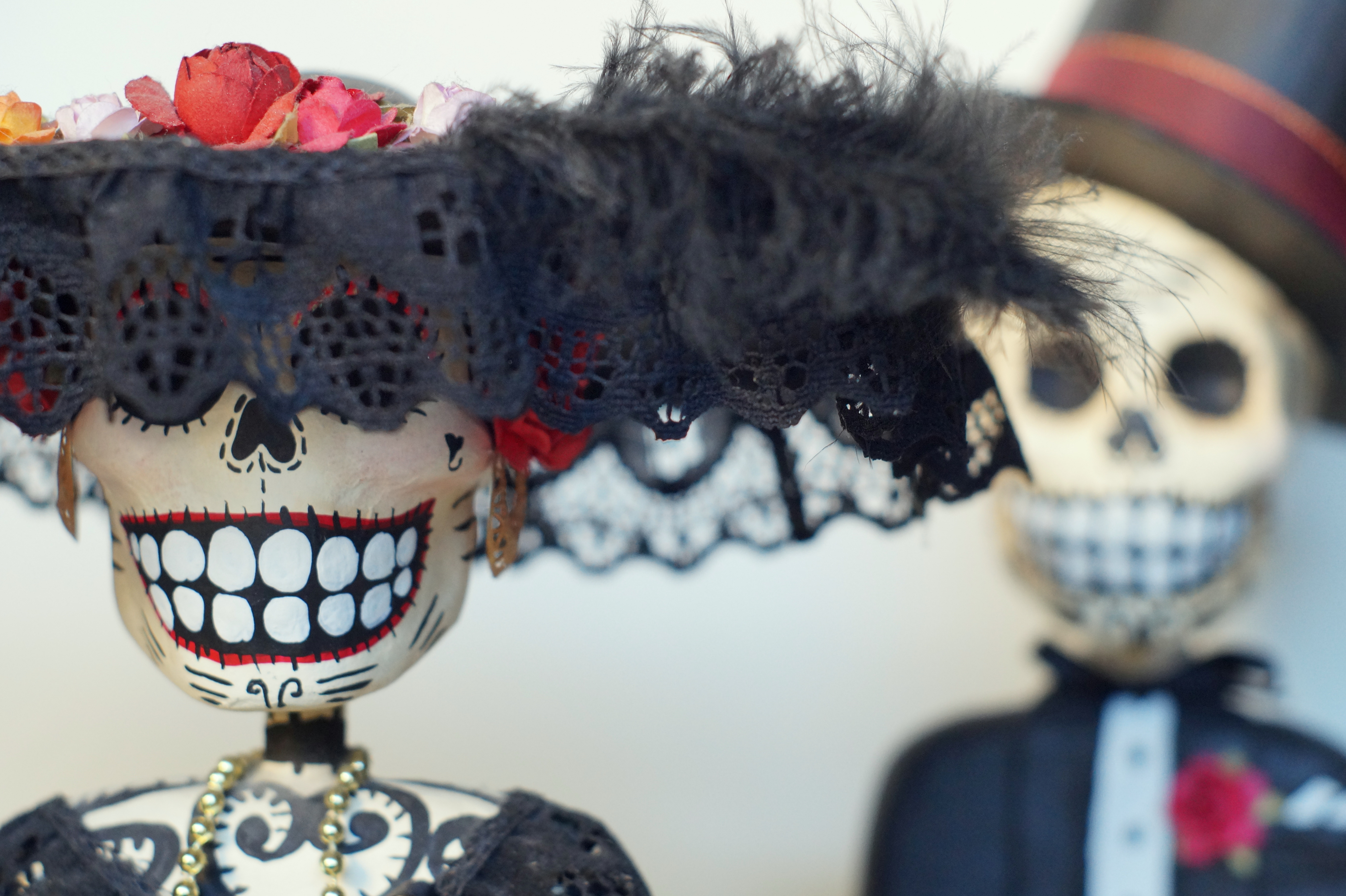
These cardboard crafts, bought at the store at the Museo de Arte Popular of México in 2009.

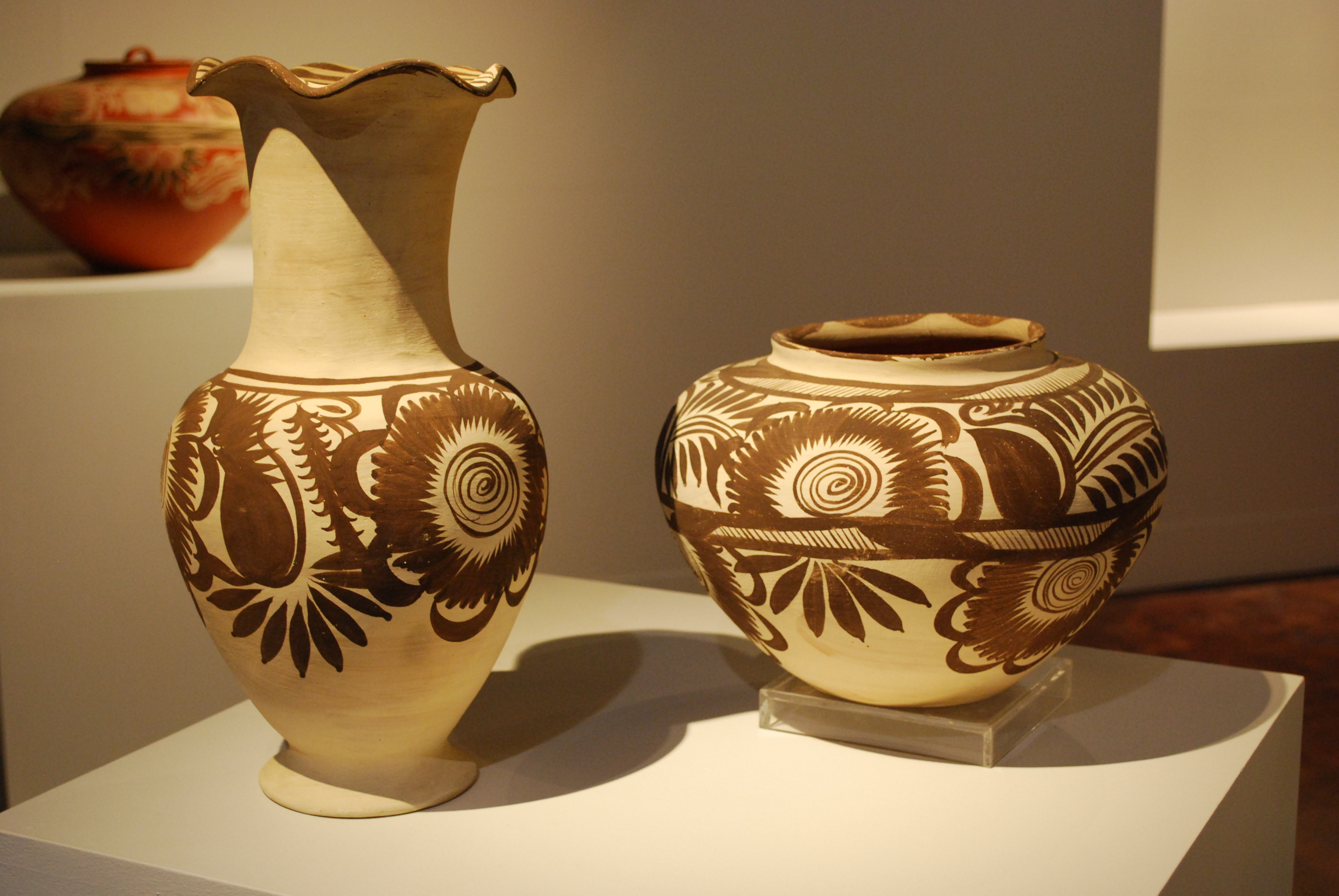
Contemporary pottery by Nicolas Vita Hernandez of Chililco, Huejutla at a temporary exhibit of Hidalgo crafts.
