= Miss Lupita project =

Project to revive the Mexican craft of papier-mâché dolls

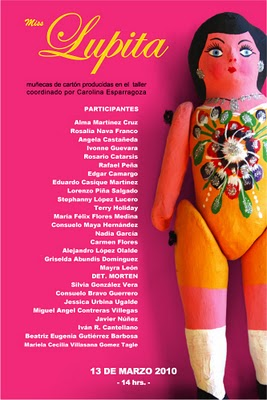
- Poster from the project
- Movement: Mexican handcrafts and folk art
- Website: http://misslupitamx.blogspot.mx/

Miss Lupita is a project based in Mexico City with the aim of reviving the traditional craft of Lupita dolls. The dolls originated in the late 18th and early 19th century as a way to cheaply copy more expensive imported dolls for poorer families. The dolls are made from a very hard form of papier-mâché called “cartonería” which is also used to create alebrijes and skeletal figures for Day of the Dead. However, the craft has waned with the only workshops making and selling them located in Celaya in the state of Guanajuato, mostly as collector’s items. The project’s aim was to create more contemporary designs through a series of free workshops to the public. The resulting dolls have been displayed in Mexico City, Japan and Portugal and featured in a number of Mexican publications.

== Lupita dolls ==
Miss Lupita is named after “Lupita” (diminutive for Guadalupe) dolls. These are hard papier-mâché dolls with origins in the late colonial to early Independence period, created by poorer families to imitate more expensive imported dolls from Spain.

The papier-mâché technique is properly called cartonería, making a very hard surface when dry. The body and head are made separate from the limbs, which are attached with cords in order to allow them to move. This technique has been used to make a number of crafts up to this day, most notably to make alebrijes and skeletal and other figures for Day of the Dead. However, Lupita dolls have lost popularity. Today they are made and sold only in workshops in Celaya in the state of Guanajuato, often as collector's items.

== Workshops in Mexico City ==
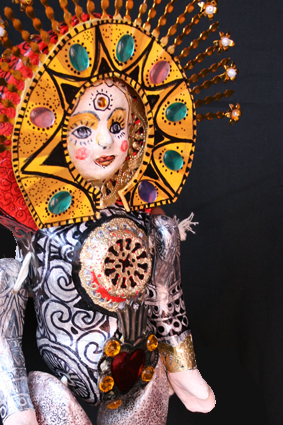
Doll named "Pita, la haceadors de soles" in honor of Pita Amor.

The Miss Lupita project was initiated in Mexico City in 2010, with the aim being the revitalization of the craft of making dolls. The name is based on the Mexico City name for the dolls (in Celaya they are simply called cartonería dolls). The base of the project would be to introduce new and contemporary designs based on urban culture through workshops in Mexico City.

The project was initiated by Carolina Esparragoza in January 2010, who continues to run it. Carolina Esparragoza was born in Mexico City in 1977. She is a graduate of the Escuela Nacional de Pintura, Escultura y Grabado "La Esmeralda".Aside from the Miss Lupita project, she has worked on video and art object projects as part of groups such as Malestares and La misma historia. She has exhibited her work in Mexico and the United States.

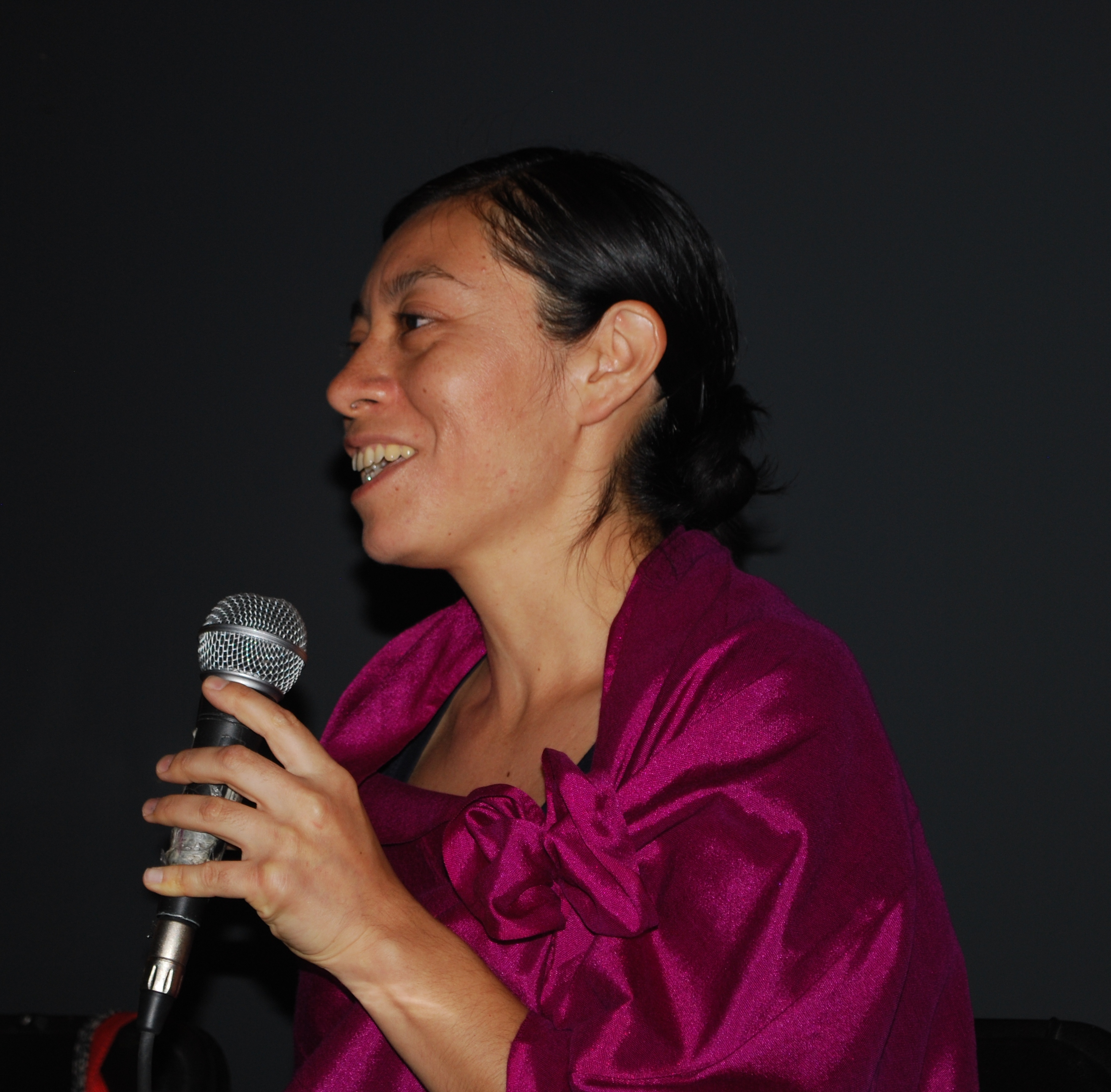
Carolina Esparragoza speaking at the Memoria de un proyecto Miss Lupita event

The project was initially sponsored by the Fondo Nacional para la Cultura y las Artes (FONCA). The project has also included the collaboration of artist Maria Eugenia Chellet, artisan Carlos Derramadero and writer Ana Clavel. Six free workshops were held in different parts of Mexico City in 2010 and 2011 with the only requirement being the attendance at all six. The workshops consisted of the history of the dolls along with how to make them. The workshops had over 100 participants with men and women between 12 and 71 years of age. They included professionals, artists, artisans, housewives, students and professionals. One participant traveled from Maravatío, Michoacán to attend.

The resulting 134 dolls have dimensions of about 45x16x15cm and took on average 25 hours to complete. Designs included dancers, lucha libre figures, mermaids, Godzilla figures, ladies-of-the-night, goddesses, cats as well as one made in the images of famous women in Mexico. The dolls were given names such as Siempre Viva, Hanami, La Memoria, Lupita Pecadora, Lupita Auxiliadora, Amalia, Gena, Adela, Encanto, Lupe la Brava and Andy.(mktokyo) Andy is a homage to Andy Warhol.

The resulting dolls were initially exhibited in different cultural centers in the city: Casa Talavera Cultural Center, the Comunidad Barros Sierre and the Centro Cultural Teatro del Pueblo, Foro Cultural Antigua Fábrica Textil El Águila. An exhibition of 20 dolls was held in Mexico City in September 2011 at the lobby of the Salón Digna Ochoa at the headquarters of the Comisión de Derechos Humanos del Distrito Federal. The José María Velasco Gallery named the project its Piece of the Month, exhibiting five of the dolls. "Beauty contests" were also held featuring the dolls and winners appeared in publications such as Artes de México, Arqueología Mexicana, Culturas Populares and others from CONACULTA, those of the Universidad Autónoma de la Ciudad de México and Mexico City Secretary of Culture.

== International exhibitions and workshops ==
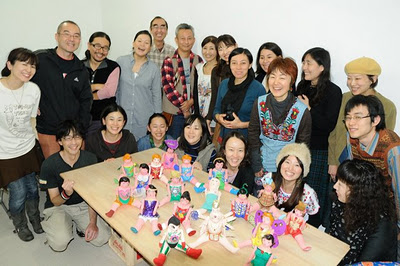
Participants in a workshop in Tokyo

In 2011, the Miss Lupita project was invited to visit Japan as a cultural exchange. This included an exhibit at the Sokei Academy and the Sagio-Plaza Gallery, workshops and a talk given at Tokyo Zokei University. The first exhibition was at the Sagio-Plaza Gallery in Sengawa, Tokyo with twelve Lupitas, eleven made at the Mexico City workshops and one made at a traditional workshop in Celaya. It was followed by a second exhibition of five Lupitas as part of a larger exhibition called México Chido.

The workshops were nearly canceled as a result of the 2011 Tōhoku earthquake and tsunami, but after meetings with officials it was decided to continue but at a later date. Participants in the workshops were originally to be giving Mexican traditional shopping bags as gifts, but instead it was decided that these would be sold for a nominal fee, with the proceeds going to the Japanese Red Cross. In November 2011, five workshops were given in Tokyo similar to those given in Mexico City. There were almost sixty participants in the workshops ranging from 25 to 55 years of age and included artists, students and workers who made a total of 59 dolls. Thirteen of the resulting dolls were displayed along with traditional Japanese dolls at the ATLIA Kawaguchi Art Gallery.

The success of the visit in Japan prompted an invitation to the Museo do Brinquedo or Sintra Toy Museum in Portugal sponsored by the Mexican embassy in Portugal. This museum has a collection of over 40,000 toys collected over 50 years by João Arbués Moreira and is one of the most important in the world. The exhibit of four traditional style Lupita dolls from Celaya and eighteen from the 2010 workshops were on display from late 2011 to early 2012.

The trips abroad were sponsored by Fundación BBVA Bancomer, the Dirección General de Cooperación Educativa y Cultural, the Secretaría de Relaciones Exteriores and the Mexican embassy in Japan.
