= Roj =

Roj or ROJ may refer to:

- Rój, a district in Poland
- Roj TV, a Kurdish satellite television station
- Roj Blake, the eponymous rebel leader from the BBC television series Blake's 7
- Andrzej Gąsienica Roj (1930-1989), Polish skier who competed in the 1952 Olympic Games - see Poland at the 1952 Winter Olympics
- Rok Roj (born 1986), Slovenian footballer
- Rings of Jupiter
- Roj, the national emblem of the Kurds

== See also ==
- Rojs
