= Rojo (surname) =

The surname Rojo may refer to:

- Alba Rojo Cama (1961–2016), Mexican sculptor, daughter of Vicente
- Antonio Molino Rojo (1926–2011), Spanish actor
- Ethel Rojo (1937–2012), Argentine actress and vedette
- Gogó Rojo (1942–2021), Argentine vedette and actress
- Helena Rojo (born 1944), Mexican actress
- José Ángel Rojo (born 1948), Spanish footballer
- José Francisco 'Txetxu' Rojo (1947–2022), Spanish footballer and coach
- Juan Carlos Rojo (born 1959), Spanish footballer
- Marcos Rojo (born 1990), Argentine footballer
- María Rojo (born 1943), Mexican actress and politician
- Sara Rojo Pérez, Spanish painter
- Tamara Rojo (born 1974), Spanish ballerina
- Vicente Rojo Almazán (1932–2021), Spanish-Mexican artist, father of Alba
- Vicente Rojo Lluch (1894–1966), Republican army officer during the Spanish Civil War
