= Filogonio Naxín =

Mazatec artist

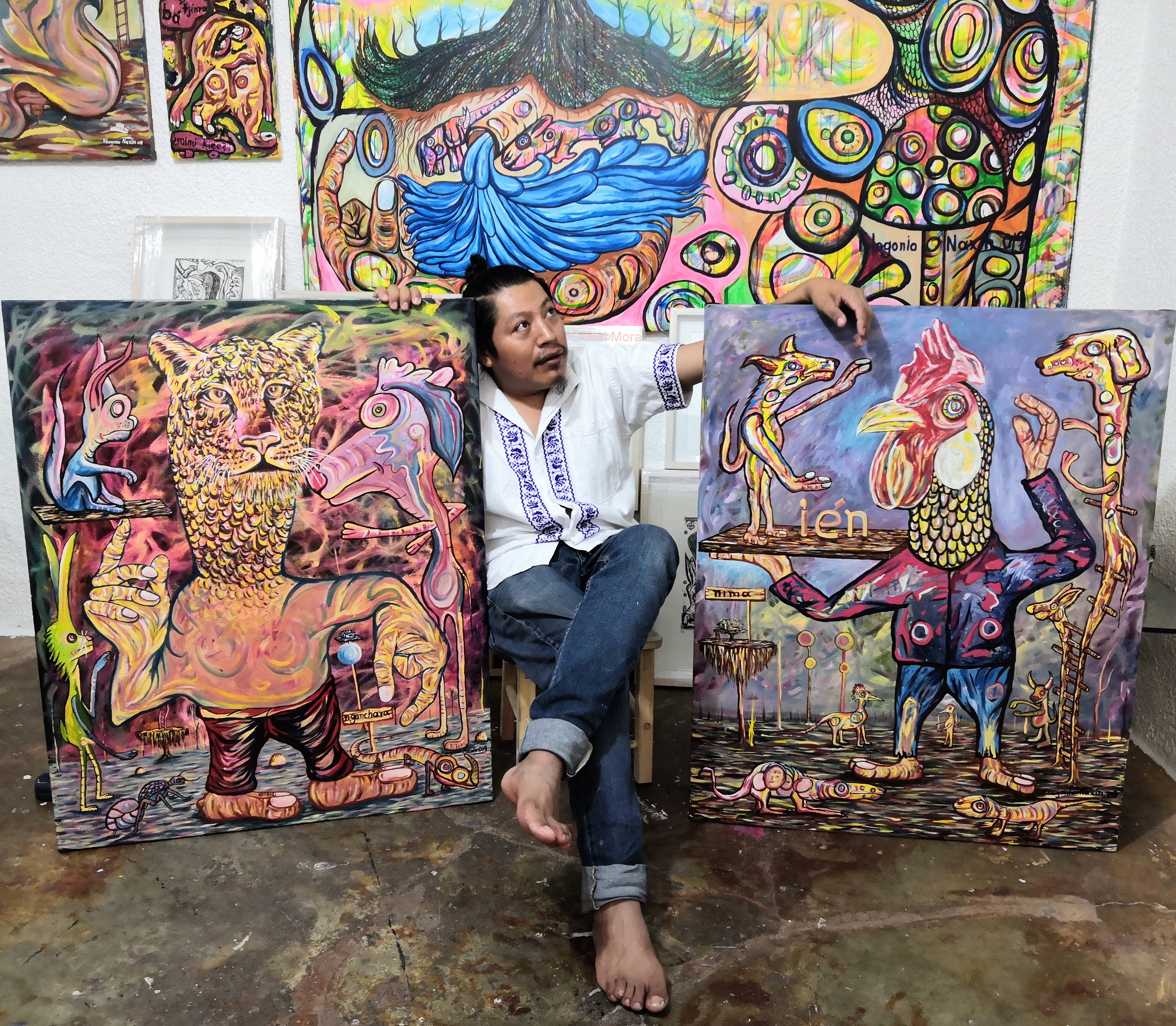
- Born: Filogonio Velasco Casimiro; 1986 (age 39–40)
- Education: UABJO
- Known for: Drawing, painting, printing
- Website: filonaxin.com

Filogonio Naxín (born 1986) is a Mazatec artist and illustrator whose work fuses Mazatec cosmology with modern elements to promote Mexican indigenous language and culture as well as comment on modern social issues. His work has been exhibited in various Mexican states and featured in magazines such as Mexicanismo, Arqueología Mexicana and Playboy México.

== Life ==
Naxín was born Filogonio Velasco Casimiro in the village of Mazatlán de Flores in the Sierra Mazateca mountains of the state of Oaxaca. He was raised in a traditional community, not speaking Spanish until he was 11, when he started school. He began drawing as a child, one of the inspirations being that of the naguals, fantastic animal-humans that he heard about in stories. Drawing continued through school, especially at first when he could not understand his teachers.

He decided to go to art school, enrolling at the UABJO, graduating in 2005. As an art student, he worked as a security guard, cashier and even butcher to get by, often using waste products from these jobs to do his art projects. His studies gave him a theoretical background but did not change how he works.

Naxín moved to Mexico City in 2013 but regularly returns to teach art in his hometown, believing it is an important way to give indigenous people a voice.

== Career ==
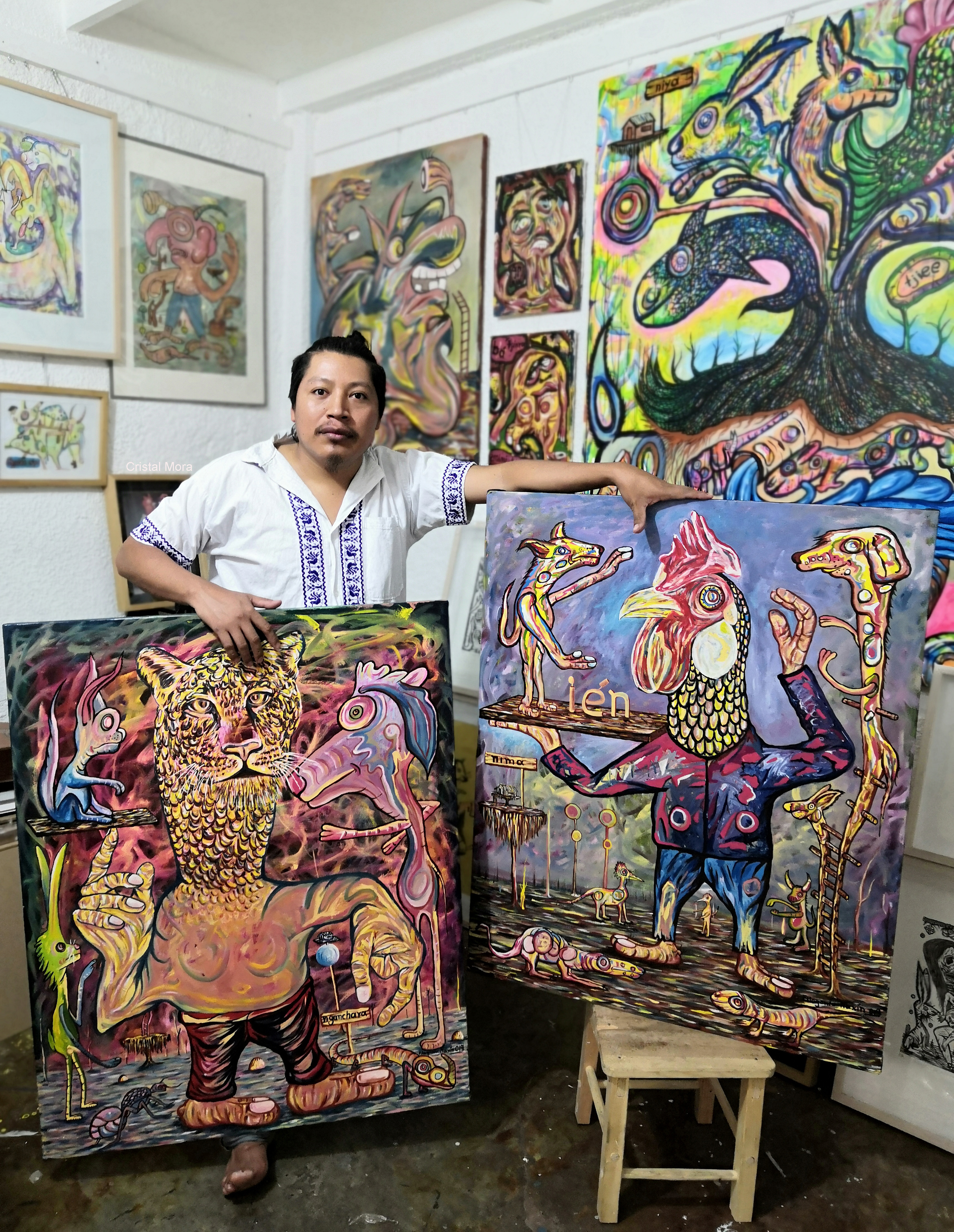
El artista en su estudio en la CDMX

Naxín began exhibiting his work in 2006 as well as began illustration. His first major chose was at the Autonomous University of Mexico City in 2013. He has had over 30 individual and collective exhibitions in Mexico City, Oaxaca and other states in Mexico at venues such as the Instituto de Artes Gráficas in Oaxaca, the Centro Cultural Casa Talavera in Mexico City, Radio UNAM in Mexico City, the Museo Nacional de Culturas Populares in Mexico City and the Mexican Senate in Mexico City.

Much of his work is in illustration for children and adults, especially in cultural magazines and similar publications.

His work began to receive national attention in Mexico in 2019, during the International Year of Indigenous Languages.

== Art ==
Drawing remains an important part of Naxín work, but it also includes monotypes, oils, watercolors and prints.

His work fuses Mazatec cosmology with modern sensibility, and he called it "social surrealism." The cosmology centers on naguals often in bright colors as the artist believes that "all humanity is a beast." Much of his work deals with the negatives of being indigenous in the modern world, as well as current social, political and environmental problems.

Important symbols include the deer, which is sacred to the Mazatec, the psychotropic mushroom made famous by María Sabina, the dog, various other animals and the horse, which is Naxín personal nagual.

The use of the Mazatec language is also important. It appears in the titles of works, of shows and/or in on the canvas or paper. It is important to use indigenous language in his work at least to show that the languages still exist. If only the Mazatec appears, it is so that the work will have one meaning for speakers of that language, and another for those who are not.

== Publications ==
- Mexicanísmo (January 2020) p. 71.
- Playboy México (February 2020) pp. 74–75.
- Arqueología Mexicana Edición especial 83 (2020) cover, pp. 6–7, 60–61.
- Cicatriz que te mira by Hubert Martínez Calleja (2018).
- minu xi kuatsura chichjána kui anima xi bantiya yajura /QUÉ COSA DICE MI TATA SERES QUE SE TRANSFORMAN Filogonio Velasco Casimiro (2013)
