= Mexican handcrafts and folk art =

Practical and artistic items in Mexican culture

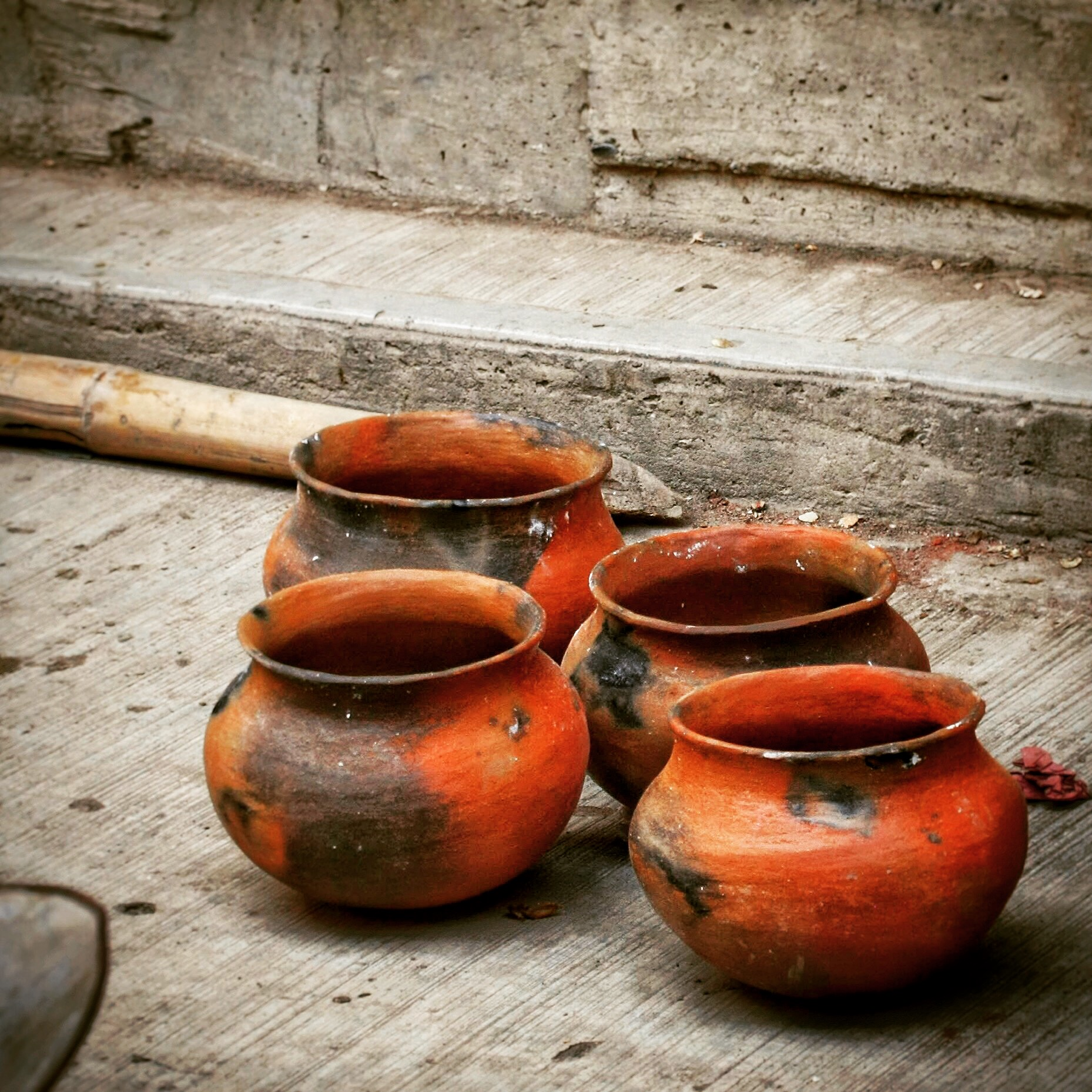
Traditional clay pots (ollas) for sale in Huejutla, Hidalgo, Mexico.

Mexican handcrafts and folk art is a complex collection of items made with various materials and intended for utilitarian, decorative or other purposes. Some of the items produced by hand in this country include ceramics, wall hangings, vases, furniture, textiles and much more. In Mexico, both crafts created for utilitarian purposes and folk art are collectively known as “artesanía” as both have a similar history and both are a valued part of Mexico's national identity. Mexico's artesanía tradition is a blend of indigenous and European techniques and designs. This blending, called “mestizo” was particularly emphasized by Mexico's political, intellectual and artistic elite in the early 20th century after the Mexican Revolution toppled Porfirio Díaz’s French-style and modernization-focused presidency. Today, Mexican artesanía is exported and is one of the reasons why tourists are attracted to the country. However, competition from manufactured products and imitations from countries like China have caused problems for Mexico’s artisans.

== Definition of Mexican folk arts and crafts ==
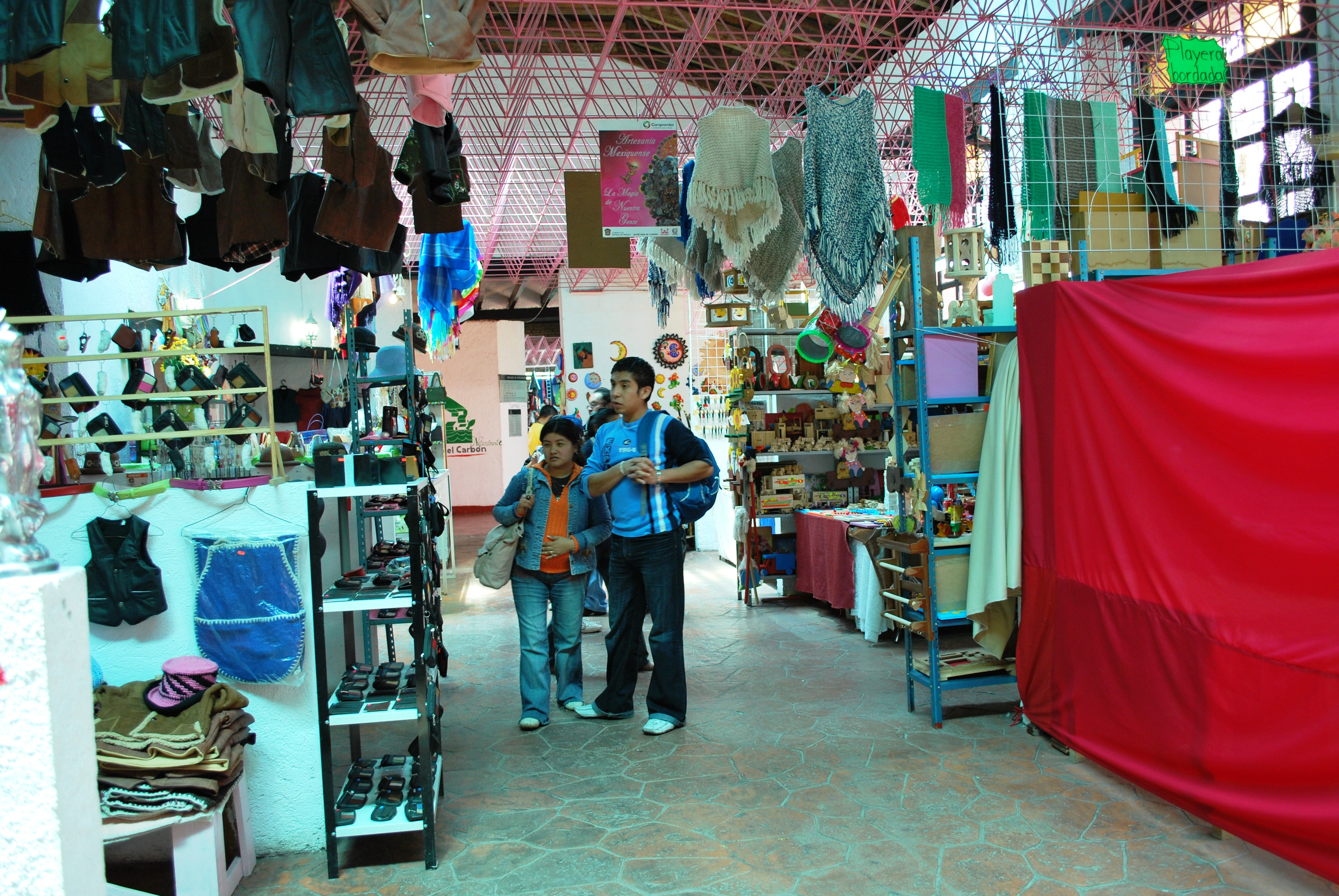
Crafts market in Villa del Carbón, Mexico

Mexican handcrafts and folk art is a complex collection of items made with various materials and fashioned for utilitarian, decorative or other purposes, such as wall hangings, vases, toys and items created for celebrations, festivities and religious rites. These arts and crafts are collectively called “artesanía” in Mexican Spanish. This term was invented in Spanish during the 20th century to distinguish merchandise made by traditional methods versus those made by industrial/assembly line methods. The word is also used to promote traditional products to tourists and as a source of Mexican national identity. Mexican artesanía has its foundations in the crafts of the many pre-Hispanic cultures within the country, but 500 years of European influence has transformed it into a mixture of the two and unique to Mexico. Most artesanía produced here shows both European and native influences in the crafting, the design or both.

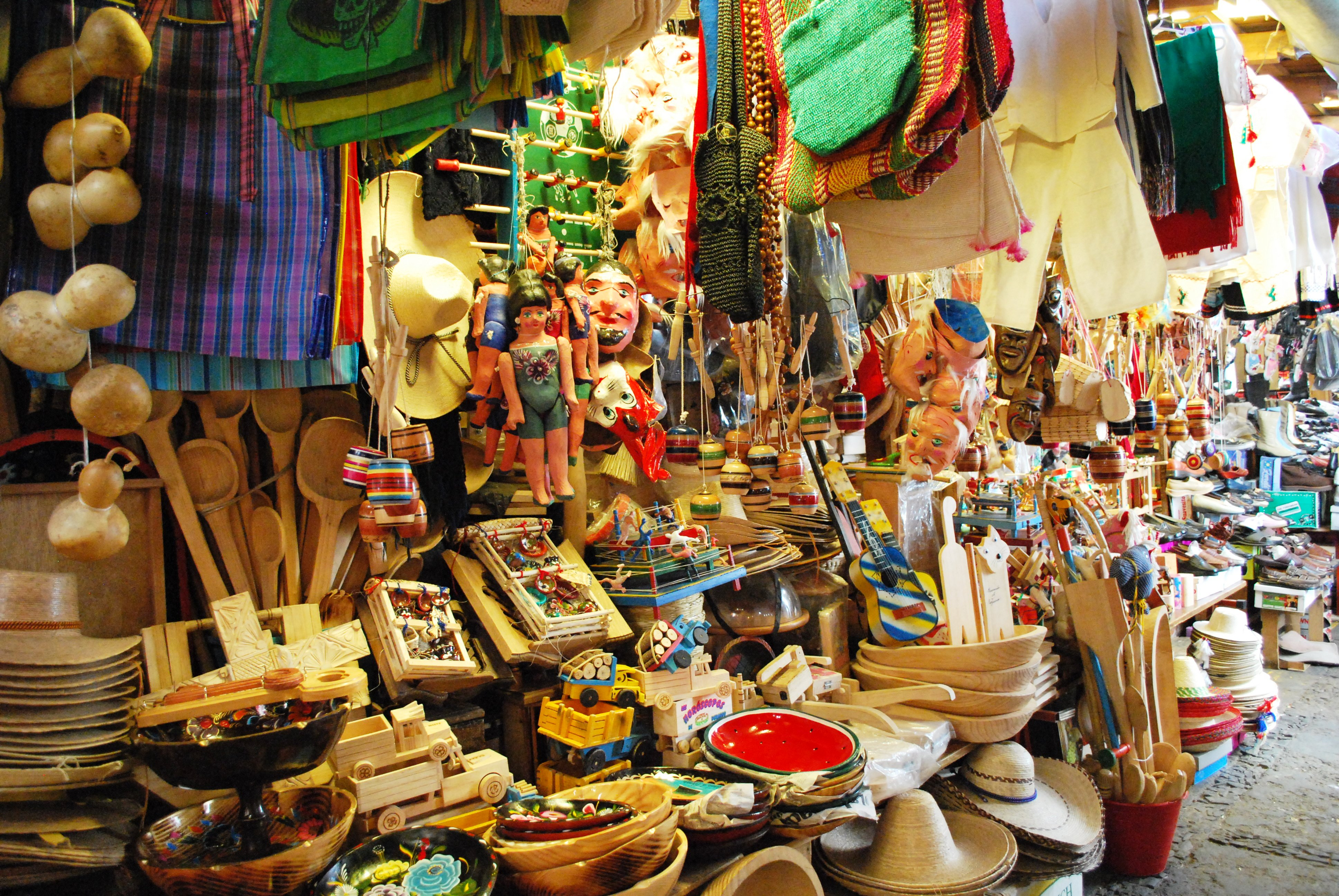
Wood and fiber crafts for sale at the municipal market in Pátzcuaro, Michoacán

Artesanía can be defined as those items created by common people, using traditional methods which are well-founded in the past. Most artisans do not have school-based training in their craft, but rather learn it through formal or informal apprenticeship. The term “common people” for Mexico generally applies to people native to rural areas and those outside the upper and middle classes.

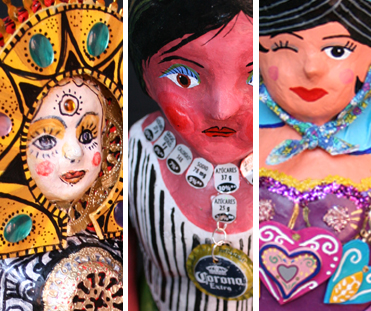
Dolls made of cartonería from the Miss Lupita project in Mexico City.

For Mexico, artesanía is heavily tied to national identity as well as indigenous identities, and this idea is often played out in movies and television in the country. From the early 20th century to the present day, Mexican folk art has inspired famous artists such as Frida Kahlo, Diego Rivera, Rufino Tamayo, José Clemente Orozco, Fernández Ledezma, Luis Nishizawa and many others. Miguel Covarrubias and Salvador Novo defined true Mexican artesanía as a blending of European and indigenous traditions, with items produced for domestic consumption, mostly for the Mexican middle class. This definition best applies to the production of pottery, leatherwork, textiles and toys. This definition is founded in the early post-Mexican Revolution era when artists and intellectuals were concerned with creating a native identity for Mexico, which revolved around the concept of “mestizo” or the blend of European and indigenous races. It was even thought by some of its proponents, such as Dr. Atl, that any change in the artesanía of Mexico would lead to its degradation and of the identity they represent.

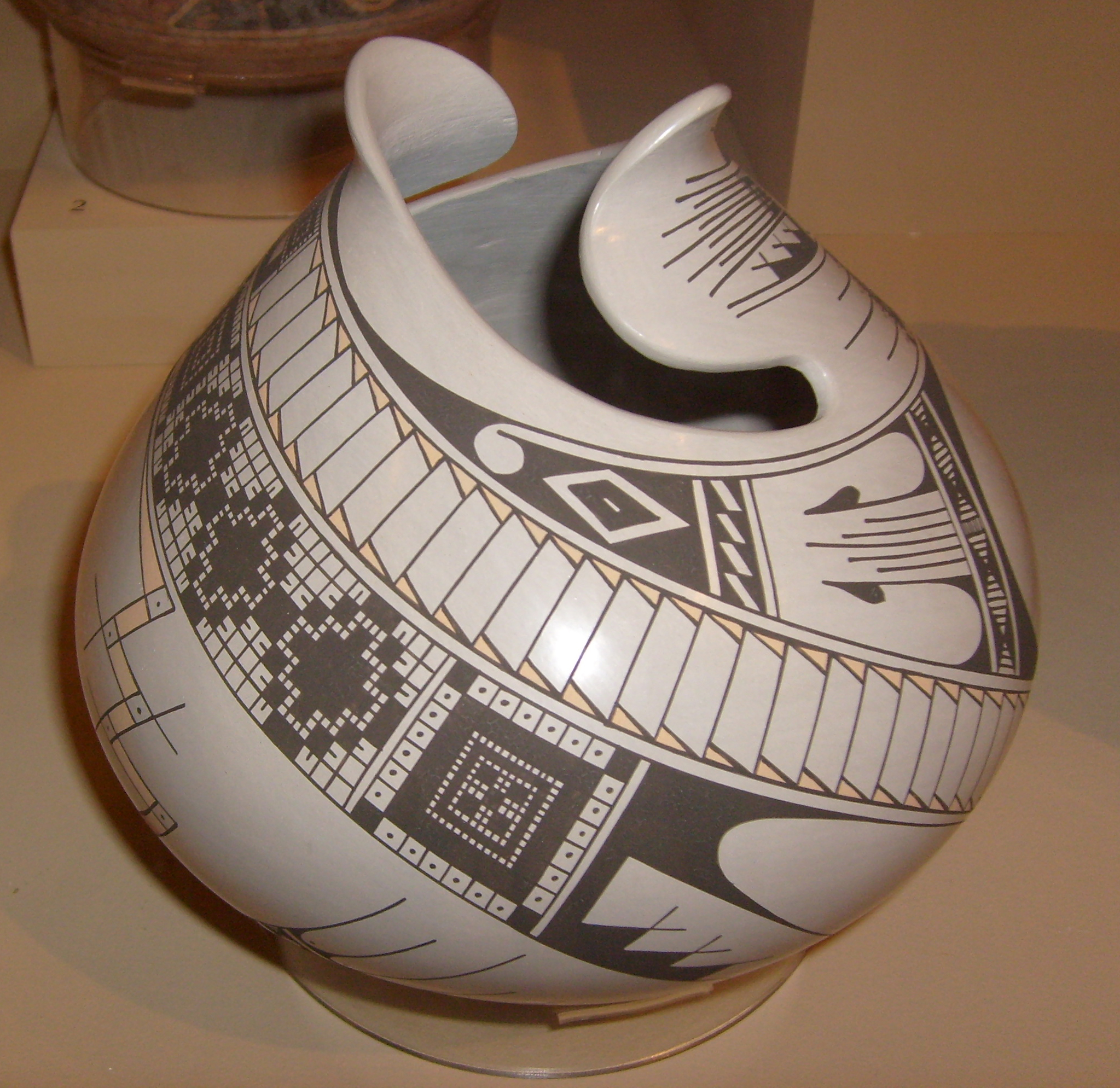
Pottery with indigenous design from Mata Ortiz, Chihuahua

Most of the artesanía produced in Mexico is ordinary things made for daily use, but they are still considered artistic because most contain decorative details and/or are painted in bright colors for aesthetic purposes. The bold use of colors in crafts and other constructions extends back into pre-Hispanic times. Pyramids, temples, murals, textiles and religious objects were painted or colored ochre red, bright green, burnt orange, various yellows and turquoise. These would be joined by other colors introduced by European and Asian contact, but always in bold tones. Even the production of colors ties into the history of craft making. Red pigment since pre-Hispanic times has made from the cochineal bug, which is crushed, dried and ground to a powder to mix into a liquid base.

Design motifs can vary from purely indigenous to mostly European with some other elements thrown in. Geometric designs are prevalent and the most directly connected to Mexico's pre-Hispanic past and/or items made by the country's remaining purely indigenous communities. Motifs from nature are as popular, if not more so, than geometric patterns in both pre-Hispanic and European-influenced designs. They are especially prevalent in wall-hangings and ceramics. Mexican artesanía also shows influence from cultures other than European. Puebla's famous Talavera pottery is a mix of Chinese, Arab, Spanish and indigenous design influences. Lacquered furniture was unknown in Mexico until the Manila galleons brought lacquered wood products here, which local craftsmen copied.

Many Mexican crafts are considered to be of “Baroque” style, with the definition of such as “a decorative style characterized by the use, and the occasional abuse, of ornaments in which the curved line predominates.” This is a result of Spanish Plateresque and Churrigueresque styles being used during the colonial periods and possibly from some highly ornate pre-Hispanic traditions as well.

== History ==
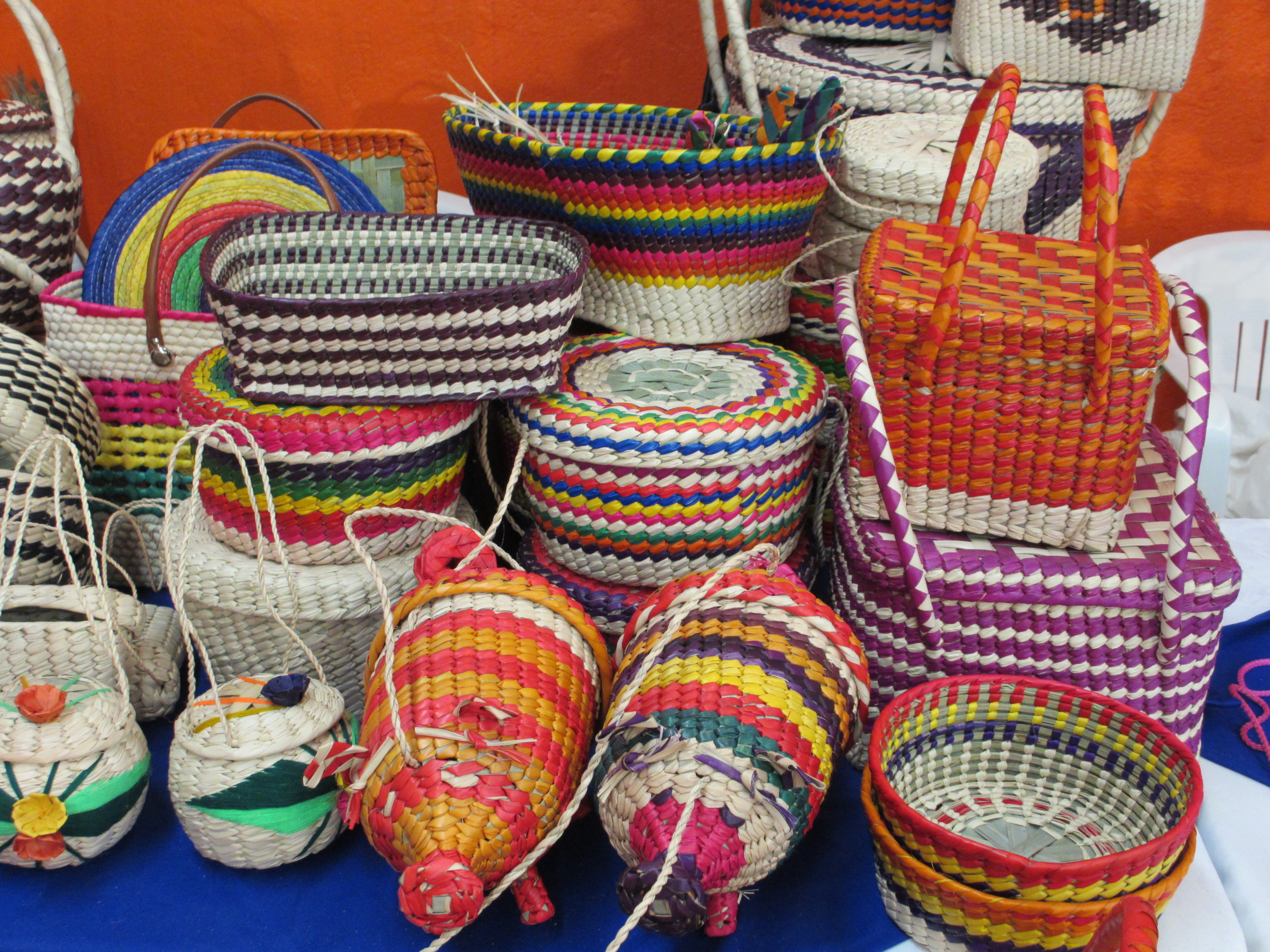
Palm fiber crafts in Nacajuca, Tabasco

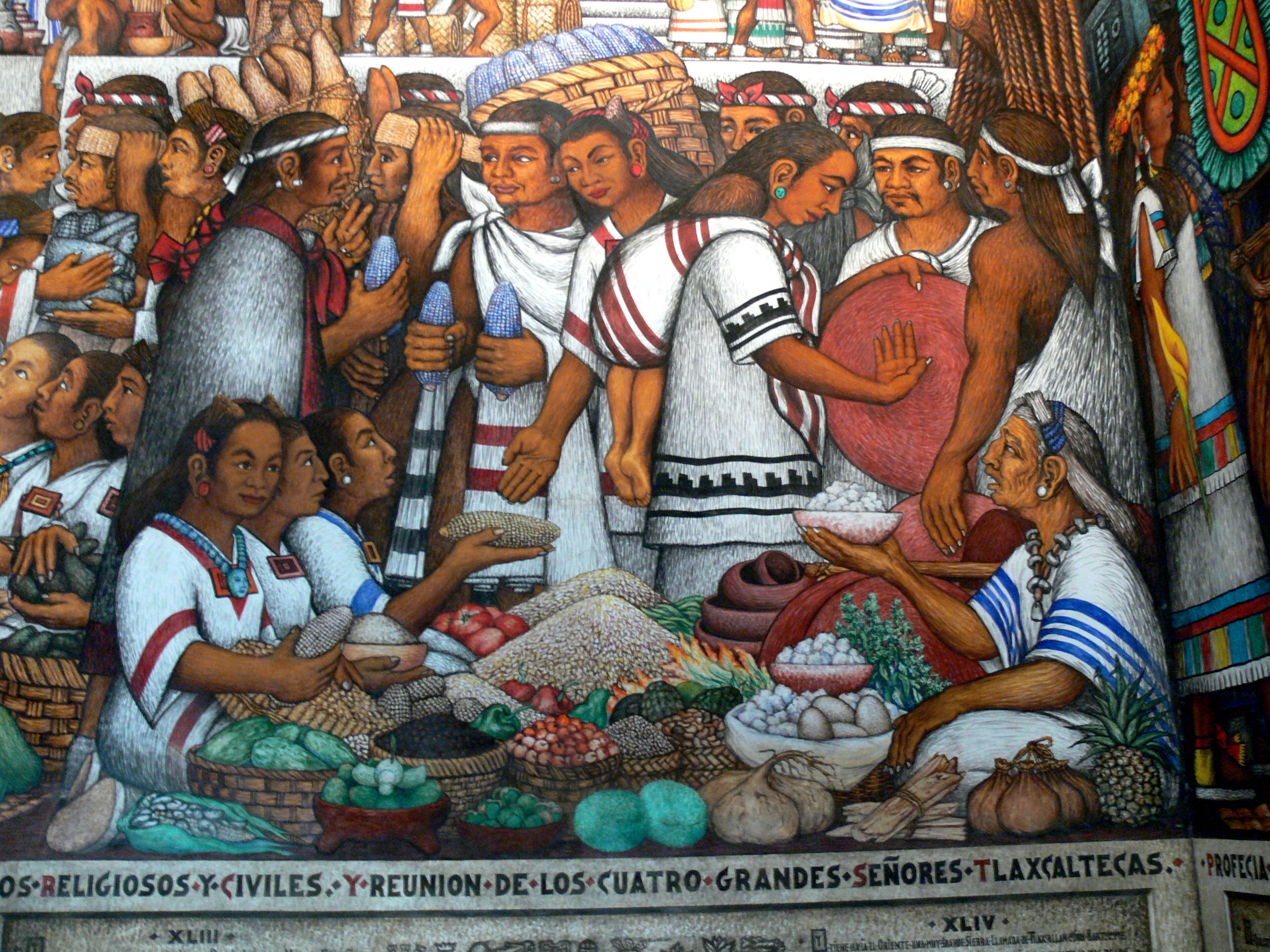
Mural depicting a pre-Hispanic market, located in the state government palace of Tlaxcala

Since pre-Hispanic times, folk art (arte popular) in Mesoamerica has been the primary vehicle through which people have expressed their dreams and fears, courted their lovers, amused their children, worshiped their gods, and honored their ancestors. By the late pre-Conquest era, the Aztecs had absorbed many of the crafts and trades traditions from the Toltecs, Mixtecs, Zapotecs and the Maya. In some of his writings, Hernán Cortés describes the myriad of handcrafted goods available in Tenochtitlan’s markets such as textiles, feather art, containers made with gourds and objects made of precious metals. Bernardino de Sahagún describes the various items made from the maguey plant, the wide variety of pottery, as well as about the privileged place that artisans held in the native social hierarchy.

In the very early colonial period, the native artisan class was persecuted and was all but destroyed, as many of the designs and techniques they used were linked to pre-Hispanic religious practices, which the Spaniards wanted replaced with Christianity. Conversely, new crafts and new craft techniques were introduced from Europe and often taught to indigenous and mestizo people in missions.

Those crafts that survived the Conquest, such as pottery, were enriched by the new techniques from Europe. New crafts were also brought to Mexico, such as saddlemaking, and naturalized by local artisans, using elements of indigenous designs. However, crafts which did not fit with European lifestyles or tastes, such as like feather mosaics, tended to disappear.

One notable case of the re-establishment of crafts in the early colonial period is the work of Vasco de Quiroga. Quiroga arrived to the newly conquered Michoacán province after Nuño Beltrán de Guzmán had murdered many of the native Purépechans, ruined many crops and disrupted the economy. He began to repair the damage by feeding the hungry, founding schools and hospitals and reconstructing the economy. He worked to re-establish the crafts that had existed previously, often introducing new techniques, and to establish new crafts. To avoid competition for the same limited markets, he encouraged each village to specialize in one particular craft or product. He was successful in bringing many native craftsmen back to their work. Quiroga was the first to systematically blend native and Spanish craft techniques as well as organization of labor. Vasco de Quiroga is still honored in the state of Michoacán, especially the Lake Pátzcuaro region, and the state is well known as a crafts producer.

In time, the crafts redefined themselves, as most of them were dominated by mestizos or those of mixed indigenous and European ancestry. However, tight control was kept on production by the higher classes and government authorities.

Near the end of the colonial period, another member of the clergy was active in promoting the crafts as way to help those in lower social positions in Mexico. In 1803, Miguel Hidalgo y Costilla settled in as the parish priest of Dolores, Guanajuato. Turning over most of his religious duties to a vicar, Hidalgo dedicated himself to commerce, intellectual pursuits and humanitarian activity. He spent much of his time studying literature, scientific works, grape cultivation, the raising of silkworms. He used the knowledge that he gained to promote economic activities for the poor and rural people in his area. He established factories to make bricks and pottery and trained indigenous people in the working of leather. He also promoted beekeeping. He was interested in promoting activities of commercial value to use the natural resources of the area to help the poor. His goal was to make the Indians and mestizos more self-reliant. However, these activities violated policies designed to protect Spanish peninsular agriculture and industry, and Hidalgo was ordered to stop them. The Spanish authority's treatment of peasants and the lower classes would be one factor in pushing Hidalgo to begin the Mexican War of Independence with his famous Grito de Dolores. Hidalgo's efforts founded the Majolica pottery industry in Guanajuato state.

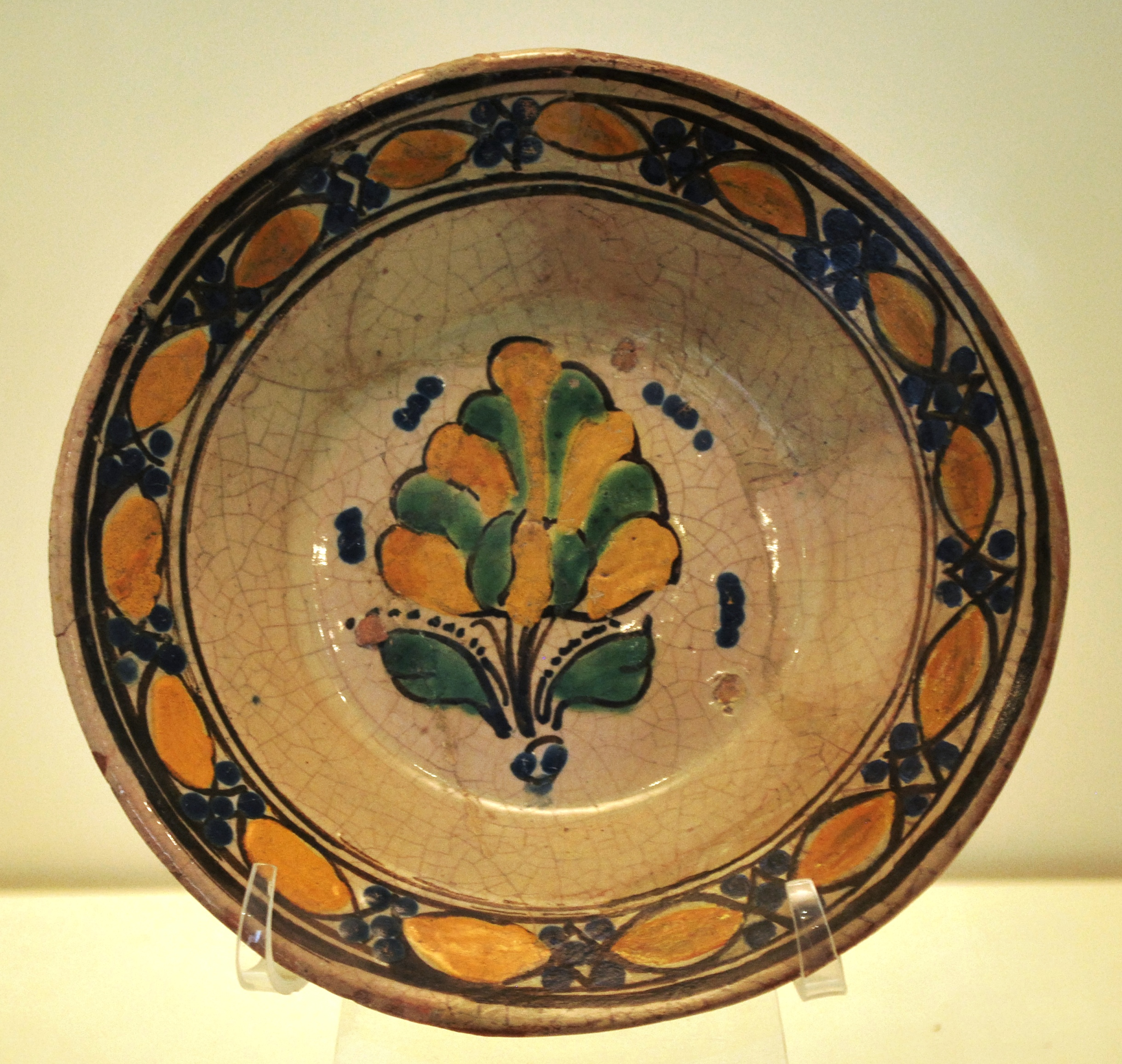
Talavera bowl from the 16th or 17th century at the Museo de Arte Popular, Mexico City

After the Mexican War of Independence, the crafts’ guilds that had regulated manufacture through the colonial period were abolished. Since anyone could call themself a craftsman, product quality deteriorated badly, especially in pottery, foreign products entered the country freely and industrialization began to take hold. To help stop the socio-economic deterioration of artisans, brotherhoods, cooperatives and professional organizations were founded. However, indigenous artists generally did not join these associations, and they remained within their own socioeconomic organizations.

The status of native crafts remained precarious and were further depreciated during what is now known as the Porfirato, or the long rule of President Porfirio Díaz from the 1880s to 1910. Not only crafts, but just about everything native to Mexico was nearly discarded in favor of French-style and modernization.

The Porfirato was ended by the Mexican Revolution. Near the end of the Revolution, there was a desire on the part of artists, intellectuals and politicians to define and promote a national Mexican identity. Part of this effort was aimed at Mexico's crafts tradition. A number of Mexican intellectuals and artists, including Dr. Atl and Adolfo Best Maugard, were fascinated in folk art. Convinced of its importance, they began to write about the subject, and since then numerous books about the topic have been published. President Alvaro Obregon was interested in promoting Mexican crafts outside of Mexico. A group of academics and artists interested in folk art was commissioned to form the first collections of these for public display. This group included Gerardo Murillo, Javier Guerrero, Ixca Farías, Roberto Montenegro and Gabriel Fernández Ledezma.

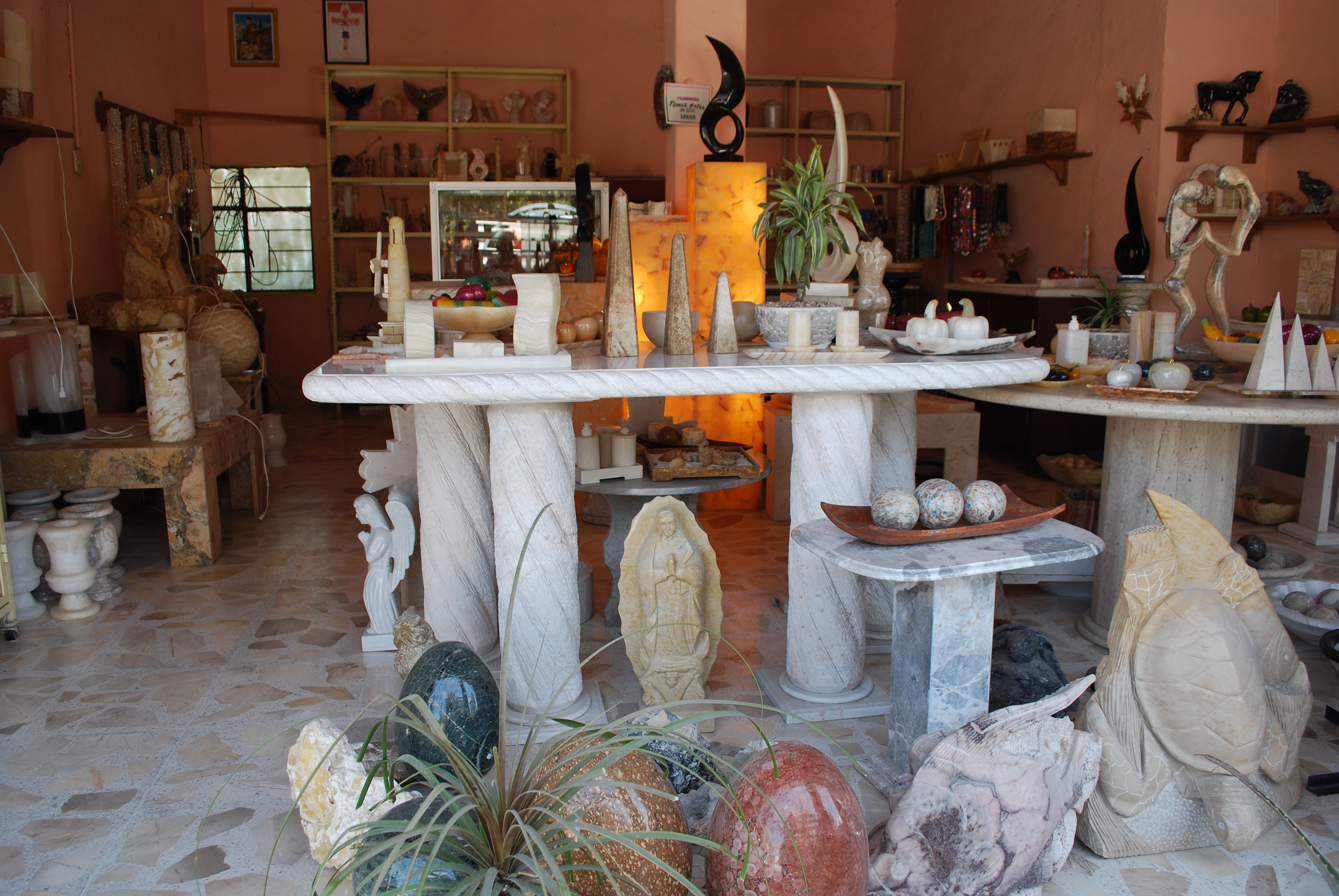
Objects crafted from local marble in Vizarrón, Querétaro, Mexico

The centennial of the end of the Mexican War of Independence in 1821 prompted two major exhibitions of Mexican folk art, one in Mexico City and the other in Los Angeles. These were conceived of by Roberto Montenegro and Jorge Enciso, with help from Xavier Guerrero, Adolfo Best Maugard and Gerardo Murillo or Dr Atl. At this time period, Dr Atl published a two-volume work called "Las artes populares de México" (Folk arts of Mexico) which became an authority on the subject. This survey included discussions on pottery, fired-clay earthenware, toys, silverwork, goldwork, feather mosaics, basketry, textiles, wood objects, folk religious paintings called ex-votos or retablos as well as other folk art expression such as theater, poetry and printmaking.

In the 1920s, upper-class homes were still mostly arranged in European style, with the middle and lower classes adorning their homes with crafts such as serapes from Oaxaca. During the 1920s and 1930s, Mexican artists and academics such as Diego Rivera, Adolfo Best Maugart and Frida Kahlo promoted Mexican folk arts and crafts as well as foreigners such as Francisca Toor and William Spratling. Diego Rivera and Frida Kahlo encouraged linked Mexican identity with indigenous crafts, with Frida adopting indigenous dress as her look.

Folk art did have significant influence on the fine arts in Mexico during these decades, which can be seen in paintings by Frida Kahlo, María Izquierdo, Roberto Montenegro and others. One particular influence was the use of bold colors. Artesanía was depicted as a phenomenon of the masses, with the aim of promoting Mexican national identity. Despite the support for artesanía by many of Mexico's elite, foreign collectors, critics and gallery owners in the first decades of the 20th century, the pieces themselves were never considered true art. They were considered to be examples of native intuition, genius and tradition but not individual talent. For most of the 20th century, what had mostly been discussed about Mexican artisanía is its collective meaning, especially identifying it with various ethnic groups. This anonymity assured that such expressions would remain somewhat inferior to “true art,” and its creators called artisans and not artists.

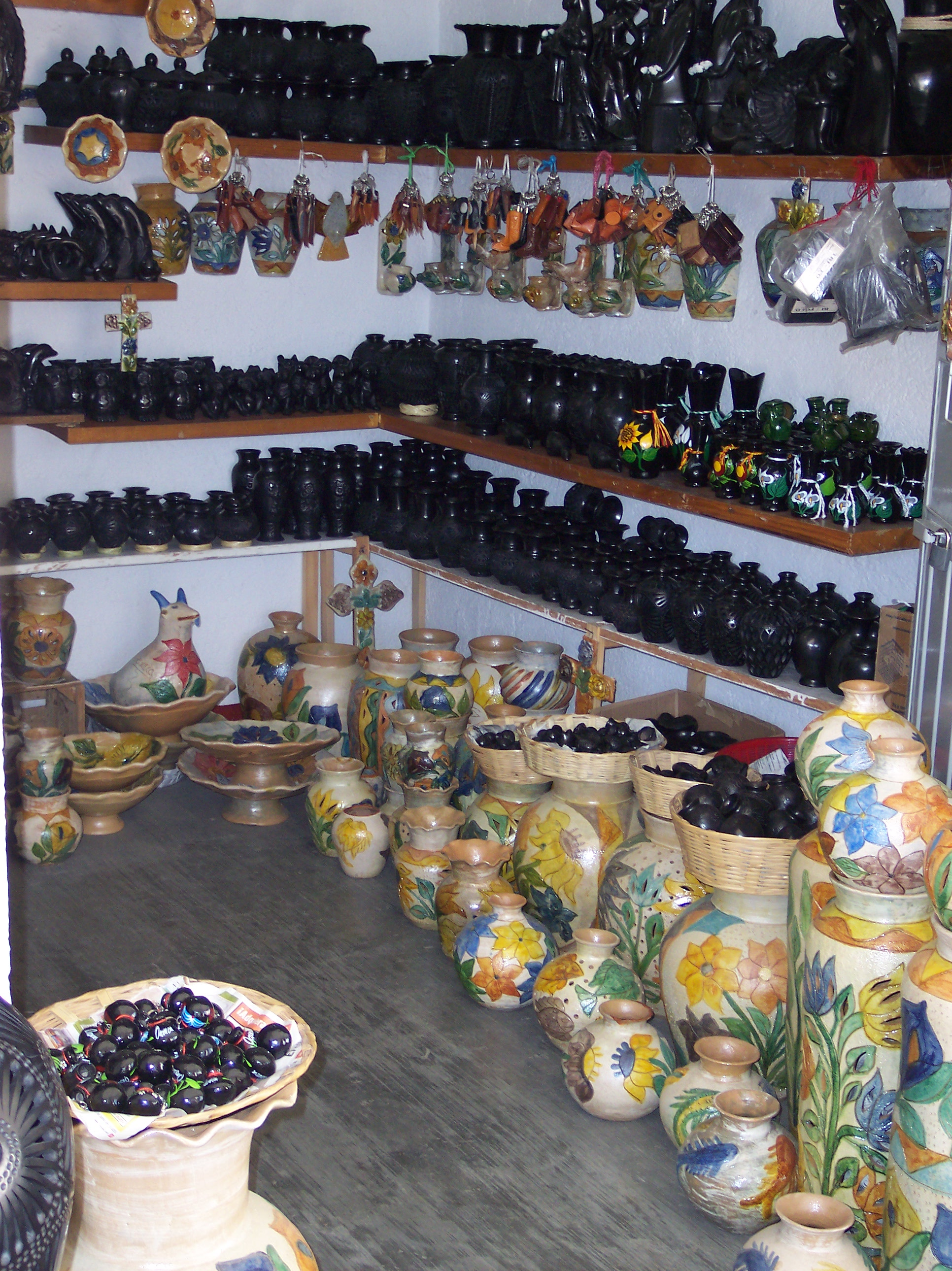
Barro negro (black clay) and majolica ceramics from San Bartolo Coyotepec, Oaxaca, Mexico

From 1920 to 1950, Mexico was the third largest producer of handcrafts, behind Japan and China, with the support described above. However, this support did not lead to major museum collections or higher valuations on the work being produced. Some crafts did not benefit from being associated with the new myth of Mexican identity. One in particular is waxcrafting, as it is mostly associated with Catholic religious items and motifs. Today, only a handful of people still work with wax and for all intents and purposes, the craft is dead in Mexico. The glorification of crafts and national icons, archetypes and prototypes in the first half of the 20th century had some negative effects. Certain images such as the China Poblana, rural scenes, charros etc., began to appear almost ubiquitously on products artisans were making. The promotion of Mexican artesanía was accepted earlier by foreigners than by Mexicans themselves. Very few examples of crafts from the early 20th century survive and most of the best collections of it are in North American or European hands.

Native Mexican appreciation of their own crafts would be helped near the mid century, in part because of the popularity of films by Emilio “El Indio” Fernández and Gabriel Figueroa. Eventually, even homes in the exclusive Lomas de Chapultepec neighborhood of Mexico City would have some touch of “lo mexicano” (Mexican-ness) in their décor. At the end of the 1940, governor of the State of Mexico Isidro Fabela created the first museum dedicated to Mexican folk arts and crafts in Toluca. Later Mexican president Miguel Alemán Valdés inaugurated the National Museum of Popular Arts and Industries, naming Fernando Gamboa as curator. Gamboa organized an exposition in Europe with great success. Adolfo López Mateos created a trust to promote Mexican arts and crafts called the Banco Nacional de Fomento Cooperativo which was transformed into the current Fondo Nacional para el Fomento de la Artesanías (FONART) by Luis Echeverría. Various states organized similar support structures, including Casas de Artesanías which are state-run store selling handcrafted merchandise. A private initiative by Banamex supports a large number of artists and arranges expositions where some of the best crafts to be found can be seen and bought.

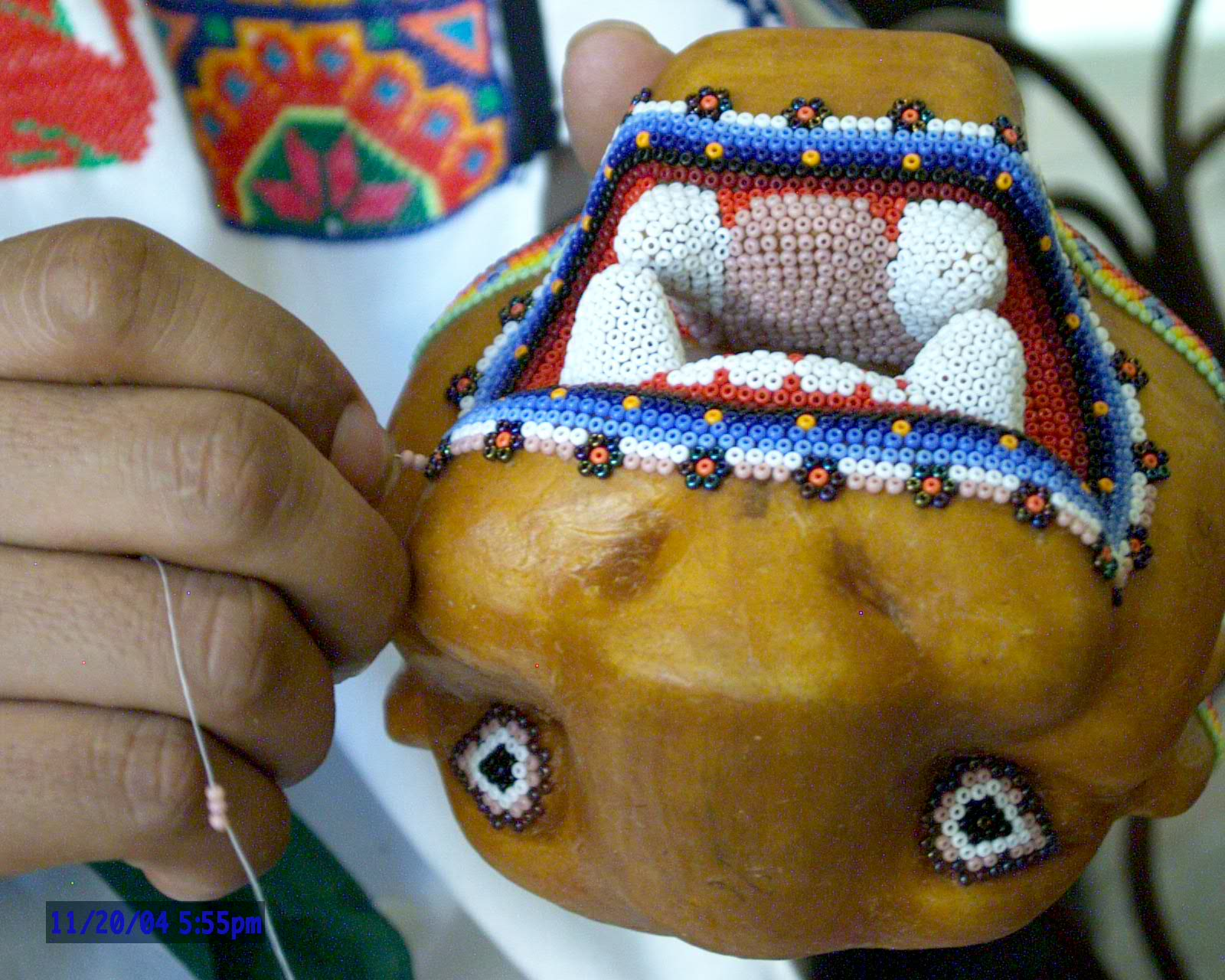
Huichol bead mask in the process of being made

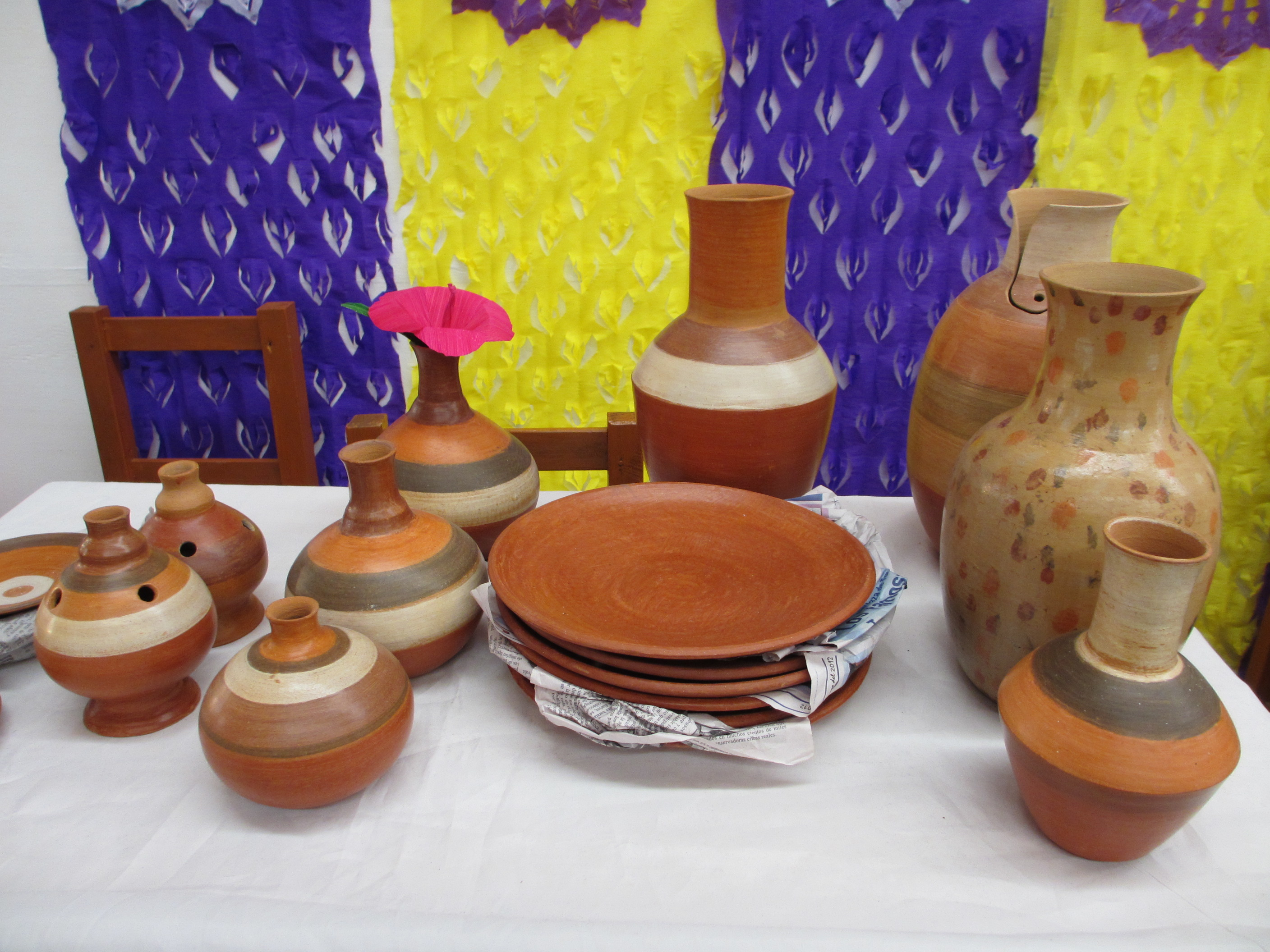
Barro (clay) objects from Macuspana, Tabasco, Mexico

In 1940, the Primer Congreso Indigenista Interamericano took place in Pátzcuaro, giving rise to the Instituto Indigenista Mexicano. In the 1950s, this institute, along with INAH created the Patronato de las Artes e Industrias Populares, which played an important part in the protection and promotion of Mexican handicrafts. During the same decade, the first socio-economic studies of these craft traditions took place, with the aim of establishing economic policies in their regard. In 1969, the first Congreso Nacional de Artesanía took place in Mexico City, which led to the creation of the Consejo Nacional par alas Artesanias, with a store named the Palacio de las Artesanías. Later the Direccion General de Arte Popular and the Fondo Nacional para el Fomento de la Artesanias were created. These would be later replaced with the Dirección General de Culturas Populares and within this entity is the Departamento de Artesanías. Next was established the Junta de Fomento de Artesanos, which published a magazine called Semanario Artístico. To promote Mexican made products, the group organized the Juntas Patrióticas, which has one objective as the exclusive consumption by its members only of folk art and crafts from Mexico. Many of these organizations have recognitions, awards and events related to artesanía including a national prize the Premio Nacional de Arte Popular (National Folk Art Award).

With the rise of intellectual and formal institutional interest in artesanía came also an ebb of interest in the Mexican populace. Much of this was due to the rise of the middle classes in Mexico between 1950 and 1980 who showed a preference for mass-produced items and the desire to be part of a progressive, national culture, rather than a local traditional one. By the end of this period, artesanía was considered to be nothing more than a collection of curiosities. Cheap imitations of Mexican crafts, especially those connected to religion, began to arrive to Mexican markets from North America and Asia, devolving into kitsch, such as images of Christ with optical illusions to make him look like he is blinking. True folk images such as exvotos were no longer made or made for tourists or collectors, not as true religious expression.

Interest in the latter part of the 20th century would be concentrated among academics, collector/“experts” and tourists. Among the artisans themselves, there has been some movement since the 1970s to break from the tradition of anonymity to having the individual's talents recognized as artists. Some who have managed to do this include Roberto Ruiz, who specializes in works made from bone, Teresa Nava who makes maquettes, Teodoro Torres who makes lead figures and many more. In each of these cases, the artists’ individual talents are part of the value of the works made.

The tourism industry and foreign interest are now an essential part of keeping the Mexican artesanía tradition alive. However, mass production of imitations are often sold to tourists.

== Export ==
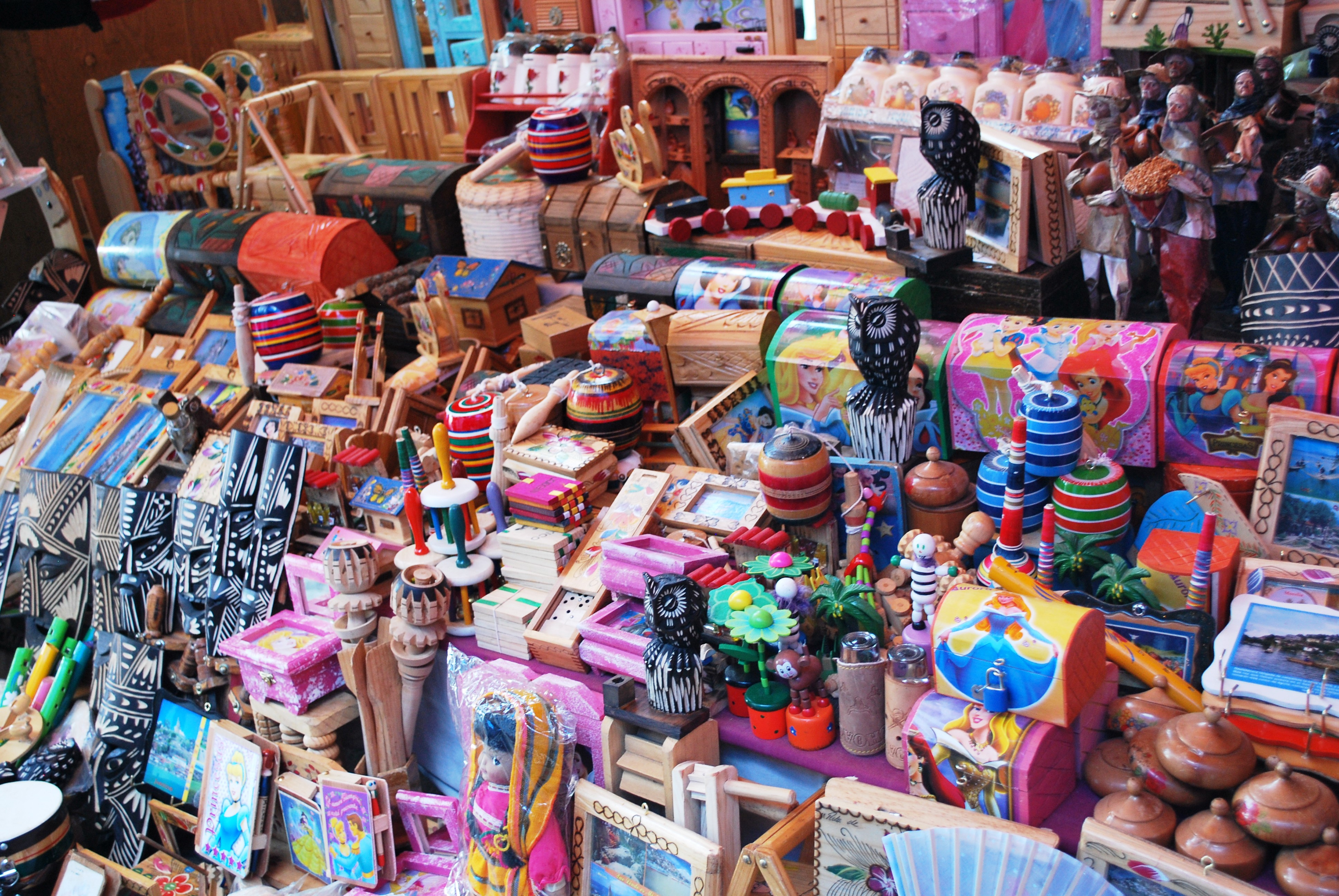
Crafts and souvenirs market on Janitzio Island, Michoacán, Mexico

Mexican artesanía is sold to foreigners in two ways. The first is to tourists, as Mexican handmade items is part of what makes the country attractive to foreign visitors. The second is through exports. Mexican artesanía is widely sold outside of Mexico, especially through the Internet. However, there is no single marketing entity or corporation whose business is to export Mexican artesanía in general. Exporting is mostly done by investments in a particular crafts by particular people, rather than a large scale promotion of Mexican crafts in general.

One example involves smaller enterprises and cooperatives attracting foreign investment and opportunities to sell their wares abroad. One such cooperative, headed by Nurith Alvarez Cravioto, in Hidalgo State consists of rural poor, many of whom have sent men to the United States to work, and ex-convicts who cannot find employment. They needed an investment of almost US$10,000 to build workshops and buy equipment. They were unsuccessful getting money from the Hidalgo or Mexican federal sources. However, their case was well known enough that a state politician mentioned them to the secretary of the Japanese embassy in Mexico. The cooperative made a sales pitch to the Japanese embassy, which agreed to fund the cooperative. This effort is hoped to lead to the ability to export the cooperative's products to Japan.

Another community in Hidalgo called Axhiquihuixtla makes ceremonial masks of sculpted wood. Sculptor Javier Astora found the community and bought their masks. They masks wound up at a gallery called Biddingtons in New York where they fetched prices of up to 350 dollars each, in comparison to the 250 pesos (roughly $25) they normally sold for.

== Maintaining the tradition ==
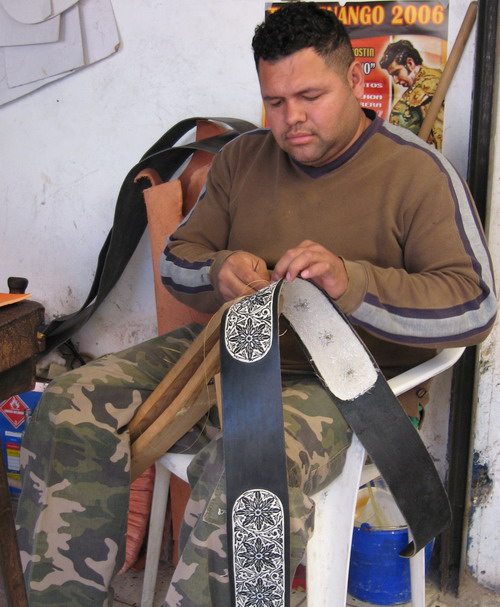
Man decorating leather with piteado stitching

As in the past, most handcrafted products produced in Mexico are still consumed domestically in everyday family life, especially items such as clothes, kitchen utensils and the like, as well as ceremonial and religious objects. Much of what the world knows as Mexican craft was promoted in the 1920s and is considered luxurious, with Talavera pottery as an example. Tradition survives in the production of many of these products. Only five percent of Mexico's artisans employ innovative methods in production, design and promotion with success. 65% continue making their crafts with little, if any, differences from their ancestors and 30% are somewhere in between.

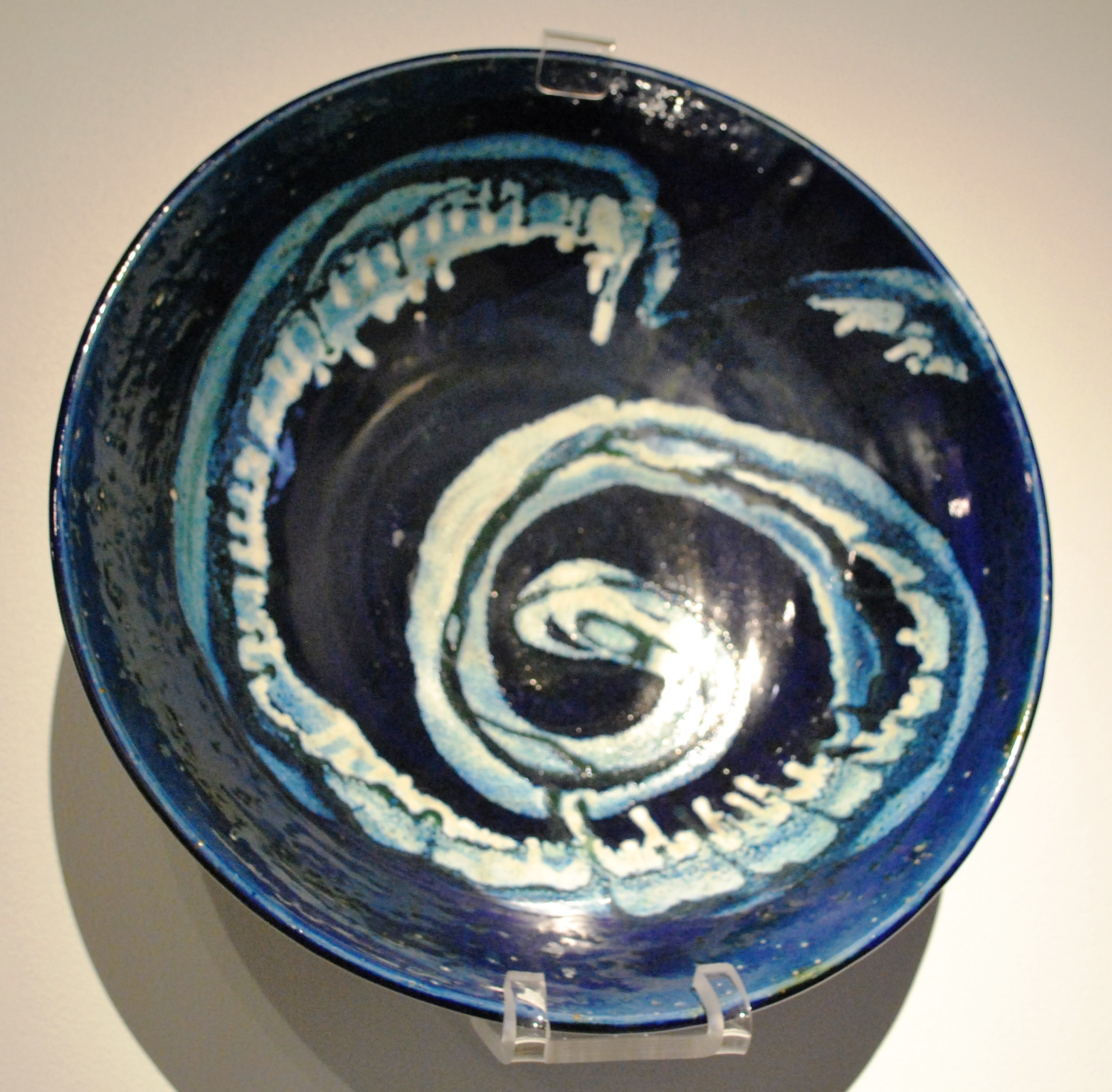
Stoneware plate with modern wave design at the Museo de Arte Popular in Mexico City

Many organizations and government programs exist to help craftspeople and promote the production of artsanía. Many art schools in Mexico have classes in certain crafts and the Instituto Nacional de Bellas Artes y Literatura has a Crafts School. In Puebla, artists such as Juan Soriano, Vicente Rojo Almazán, Javier Marín, Gustavo Pérez, Magali Lara and Francisco Toledo were invited to help redesign the decoration of the ceramics produced there (but not the production techniques), which they did by adding human forms, animals and others to the traditional images of flowers and curved designs.

The intervention of artists in the design process has been criticized by experts such as anthropologist Victoria Novelo, who claims that many of these artists “interfere” in the craft process by introducing ideas even though they have no studies in the cultural traditions behind these crafts. She also claims that many college-educated designers believe that with innovative designs, they can help the artisan get out of poverty, without knowing why the artisan is poor in the first place.

Despite organizations and institutions, most Mexican artisans are impoverished with little access to quality materials or designs, because of lack of cultural knowledge. Artisans also must compete with goods manufactured in large factories and copies of Mexican artesania imported from places like China. This keeps prices down, and the time it takes to make authentic artesanía puts the Mexican craftsmen at an economic disadvantage. This is one reason why younger generations have less interest in the craft tradition.

== Types of folk arts and crafts in Mexico ==
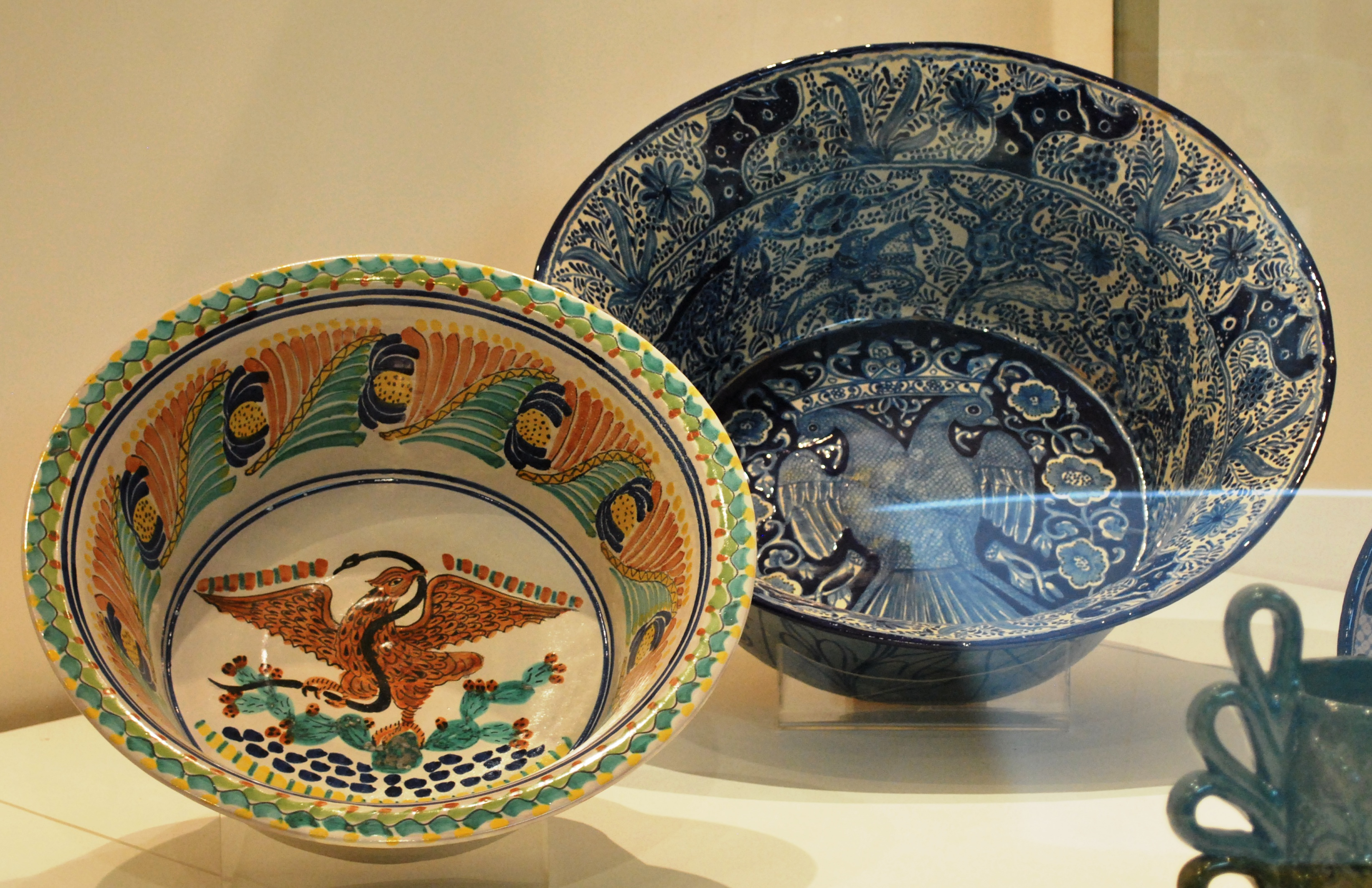
Talavera washbasins with traditional designs

Handcrafts in Mexico vary widely from materials used, techniques and employ and styles preferred. The most prevalent of Mexico's crafts is ceramics/pottery. Ceramics was considered one of the highest art forms during the Aztec Empire, with the knowledge of making pottery said to have come from the god Quetzalcoatl himself. Pre-Hispanic pottery was made by coiling the clay into a circle then up the sides, then scraping and molding the coiled work until the coils could no longer be detected. The Spanish introduced the potters’ wheel and new glazing techniques. Majolica glazed pottery was introduced by the Spanish. Puebla in particular is renowned for its variety of Majolica, which is called Talavera. One distinctive feature of this city is that many kitchens and buildings are decorated with intricately detailed Talavera tiles. Tiles are a subset of ceramic pottery and were used extensively in colonial-era Mexico. These tiles were first fired at a low temperature, then hand-painted with intricate designs, then fired at a high temperature to set the glaze. These are still made, but most decorative tiles used in Mexico are factory-made. Unglazed pottery is still made, but generally it is for decorative purposes only, and copies the designs of pre-Hispanic cultures.

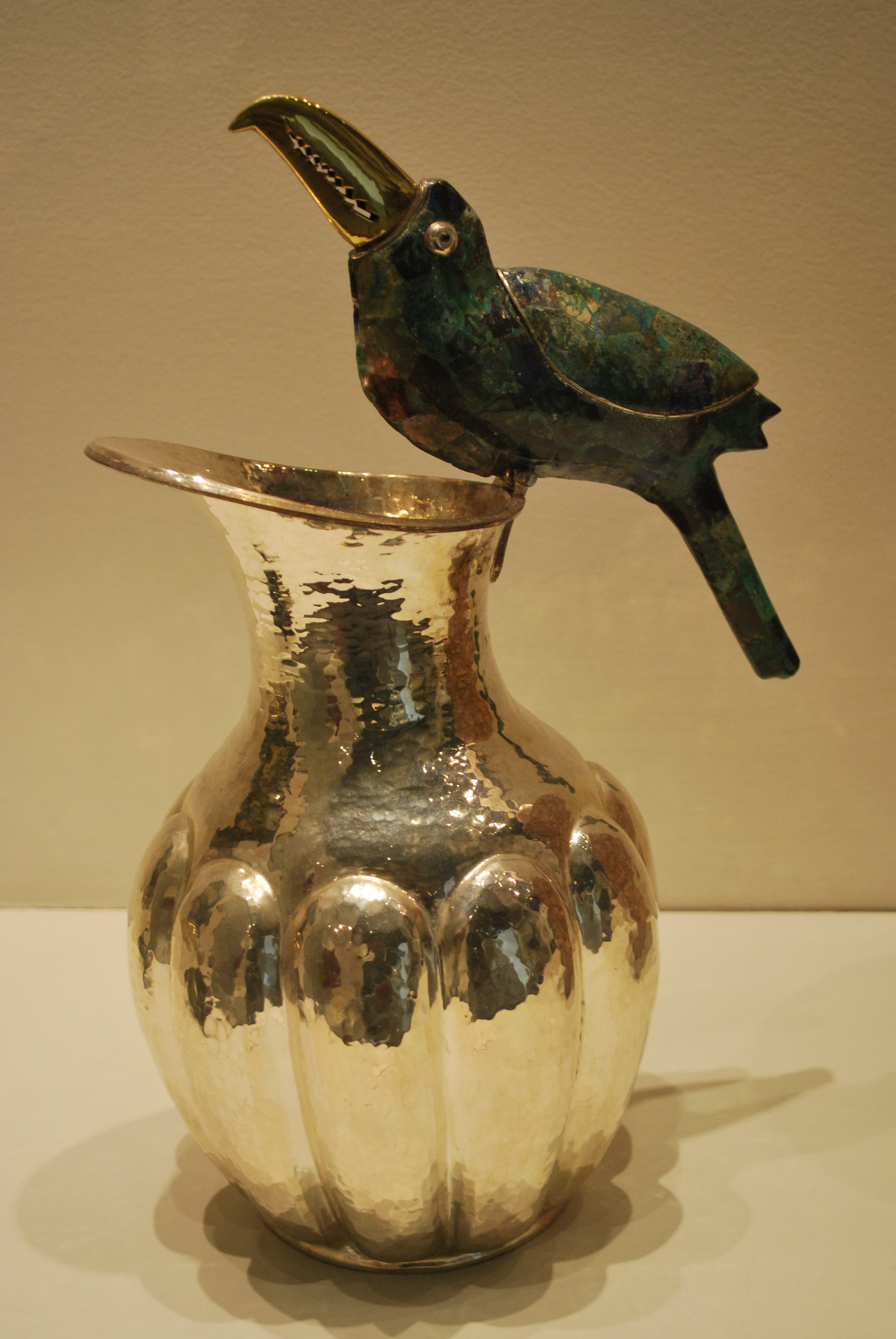
Silver jar with bird handle at the Museo de Arte Popular in Mexico City

Metalworking in Mesoamerica, especially of silver, gold and copper, was highly advanced when the Spanish arrived. Gold was inlaid into copper and metals were hammered to paper thinness and cast using the lost wax method. Some copper and iron tools were produced, but pre-Hispanic metal craft was dominated by jewelry and ornaments. The Spanish introduced new techniques such as filigree work, where tiny threads of metal are strung together to make jewelry. During the colonial period, indigenous peoples were forbidden to work with precious metals. Today, ancient designs have been revived with Taxco being the center of silversmithing. Silverwork is now one of Mexico's major exports. Copper work is particularly abundant in Michoacán. A traditional hammered copper object is a large vessel in which pork fat is rendered or sugar caramelized for making candies. Every year during the month of August Santa Clara del Cobre holds a copper festival.

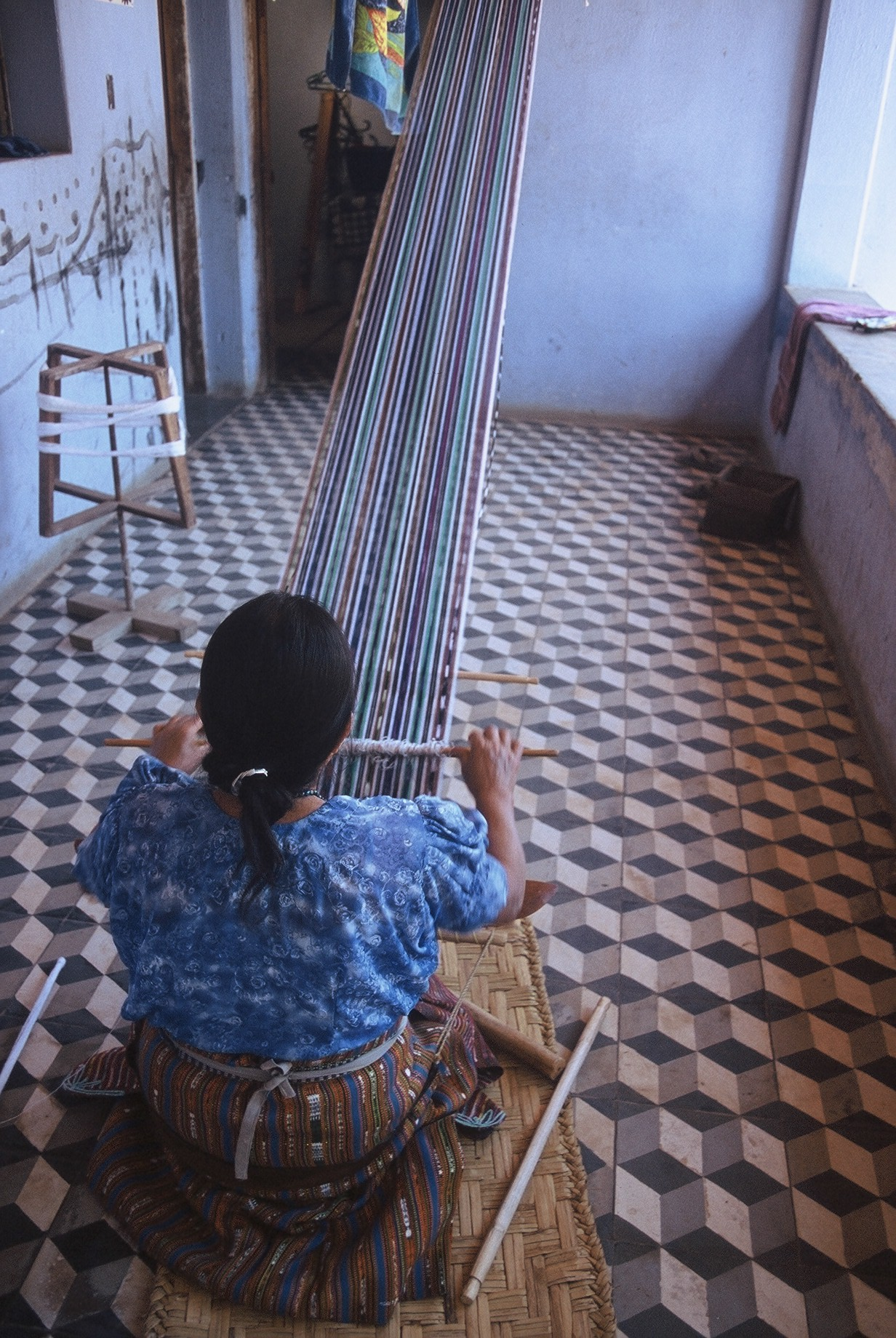
Mayan woman weaving with a backstrap loom

Many different fibers are twisted, knotted and woven into textiles and objects. Materials include rushes, reeds, thread, plastic string and rope as well as many more. Historically, fibers were dyed using pigments created from plants and animals. Synthetic dyes have replaced natural ones for many craftspeople, but there still are some, especially in Oaxaca state that still use traditional dyes. Woven materials in Mexico started with basketry and mat-making. The agave plant was an important source of fibers and thread and is still used to day for thread and paper. Cotton was also used, spun into thread by itself or combined with feathers or animal fur to provide warmth. Very traditional Mexican women still spin their own thread, which are made from cotton or wool and can be very fine or very coarse. Textiles have long history of tradition. Brightly colored embroidered designs on female garments can identify tribe, age, and marital status of the wearer. Woven textiles were known to pre-Hispanic cultures for hundreds of years before the arrival of the Spanish, using a back-strap loom fastened between a tree and the weaver's back. The Spanish introduced the treadle loom, which can make larger pieces of cloth.

Weaving is a craft practiced by men, women and children in Mexico and just about every fiber available is crafted into utilitarian objects such as placemats, baskets, hats and bags. Many of the materials used are left in their natural color but some can be dyed vivid colors. In addition, plastic fibers are beginning to be used.

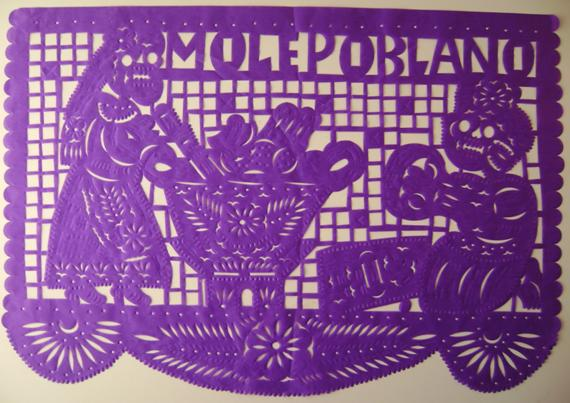
Cut paper banner (papel picado) for Día de Muertos featuring a Mole poblano theme

Paper is both made and used to make crafts in Mexico. Paper-making is a skill that goes back to pre-Hispanic times. The bark of two trees are primarily used, that of the morus or mulberry family for white paper and that of the ficus or fig family for darker varieties. Traditionally, the bark was cut and scraped by men, but the making the paper itself was done by women. The process begins by washing the bark, then boiling it with ashes. It is then rinsed and beaten until the fibers knit together, then dried in the sun. Banderolas, or cut-paper banners, are hung in the streets for special occasions.

Leatherwork in Mexico is closely tied to the charro/vaquero, or cowboy tradition, focusing on the creation of saddles, belts and boots. However, leatherwork can also be seen in seat covers, such as those on equipale chairs and as lampshades. Leatherwork is traditionally decorated with flowing patterns using the labor-intensive punch and tool method and colored with dye or varnish.

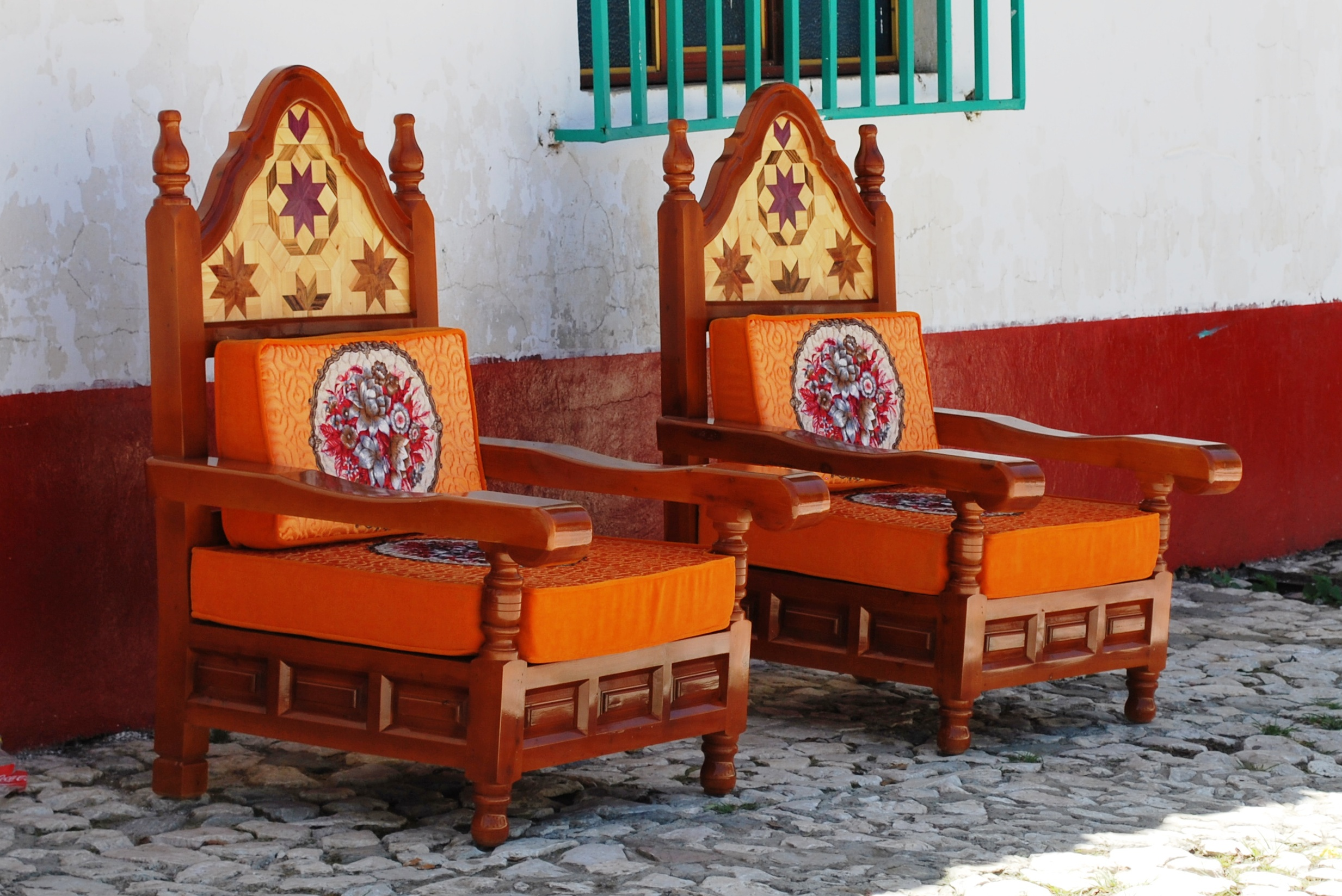
Parquetry furniture for sale in Ixcateopan de Cuauhtémoc, Guerrero, Mexico

The palaces and noble home of the Aztecs had ornate furniture. Entire pieces of hardwoods would be carved into benches and tables, and other items. Furniture was inlaid with gold and some covered in animal skins. A kind of shellac or lacquer existed in pre-Hispanic Mexico and was used in many ceramics. The Mendocino Codex mentions it as a kind of waterproof oil extracted from a worm called “axe” and mixed with oil from the prickly poppy seed or Mexican sage seed and pigments, which resulted in a paint. After the Conquest, the Spanish demanded European style furniture, which was usually made by indigenous craftsmen. As colonial Mexico was Spain's gateway to Asia, oriental techniques such as parquetry and other types of inlay became common as well. The state of Michoacán is a major producer of handcrafted furniture, which can be simply varnished or stained or painted in bright colors.

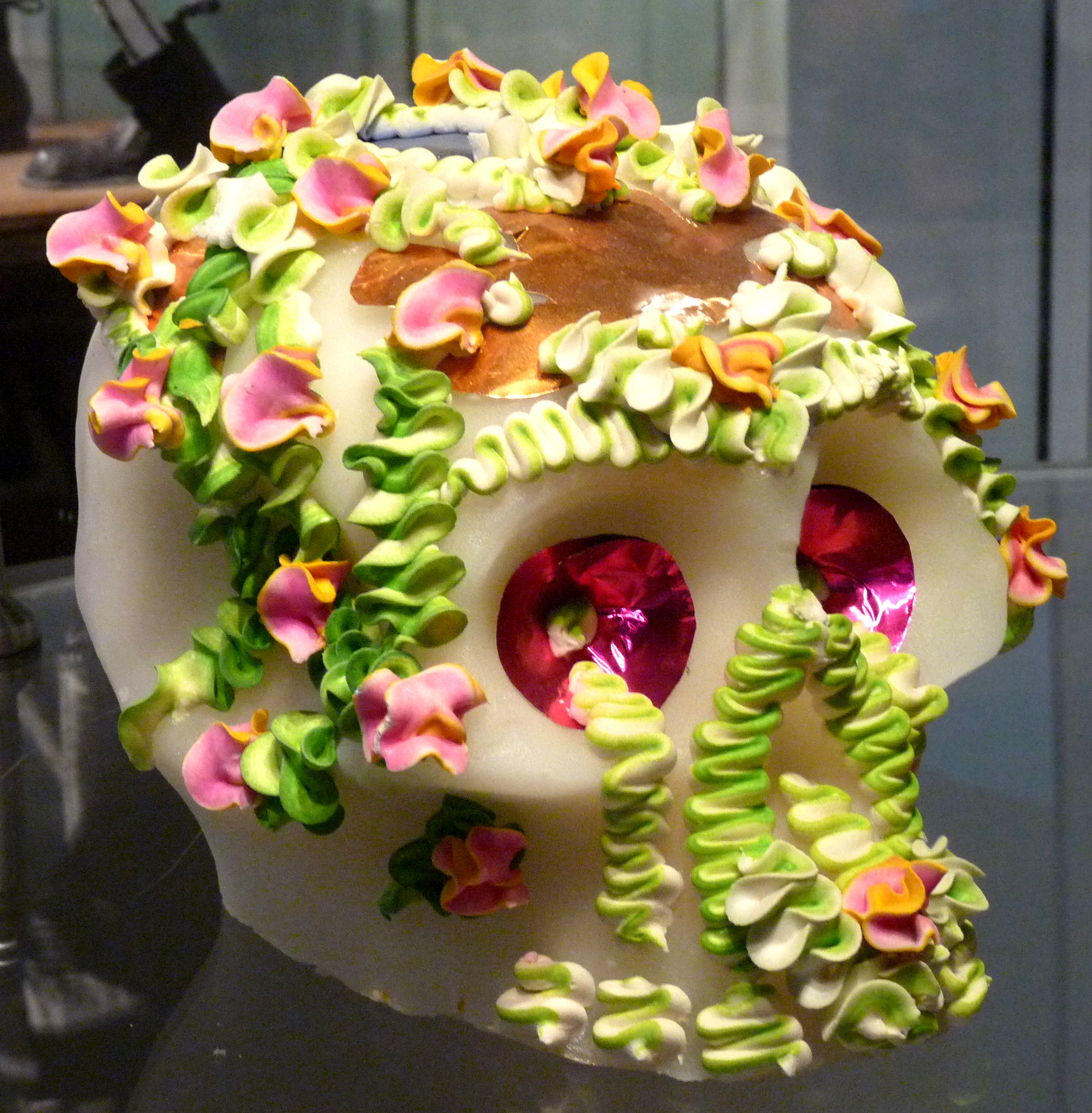
Decorated sugar skull (calavera de azúcar) for Day of the Dead

Ceremonial objects are produced in every region of the country in all different shapes, sizes and colors, whose sole purpose is to celebrate saints and holidays and honor the dead. One of the major holidays for artesanía is Day of the Dead. Objects are created to decorate houses and create “ofrendas” (altars to the deceased) such as candy skulls, decorated skeletons, many of which are dressed to imitate professions such as doctors. Large quantities of flowers and other plant matter to create decorations for ofrendas and for graves. There is also a special burnished black pottery which is used for objects related to the Day of the Dead. Another major holiday for crafts is the Christmas season, where sales of piñatas peak and ornate nativity scenes are constructed in homes. For Palm Sunday, intricate crosses are woven from palm fronds. In some places in Mexico during Holy Week, large papier-mâché effigies of Judas Iscariot are ritually burned. For the feast days of patron saints, cut paper banners are strung over roads and hung in windows.

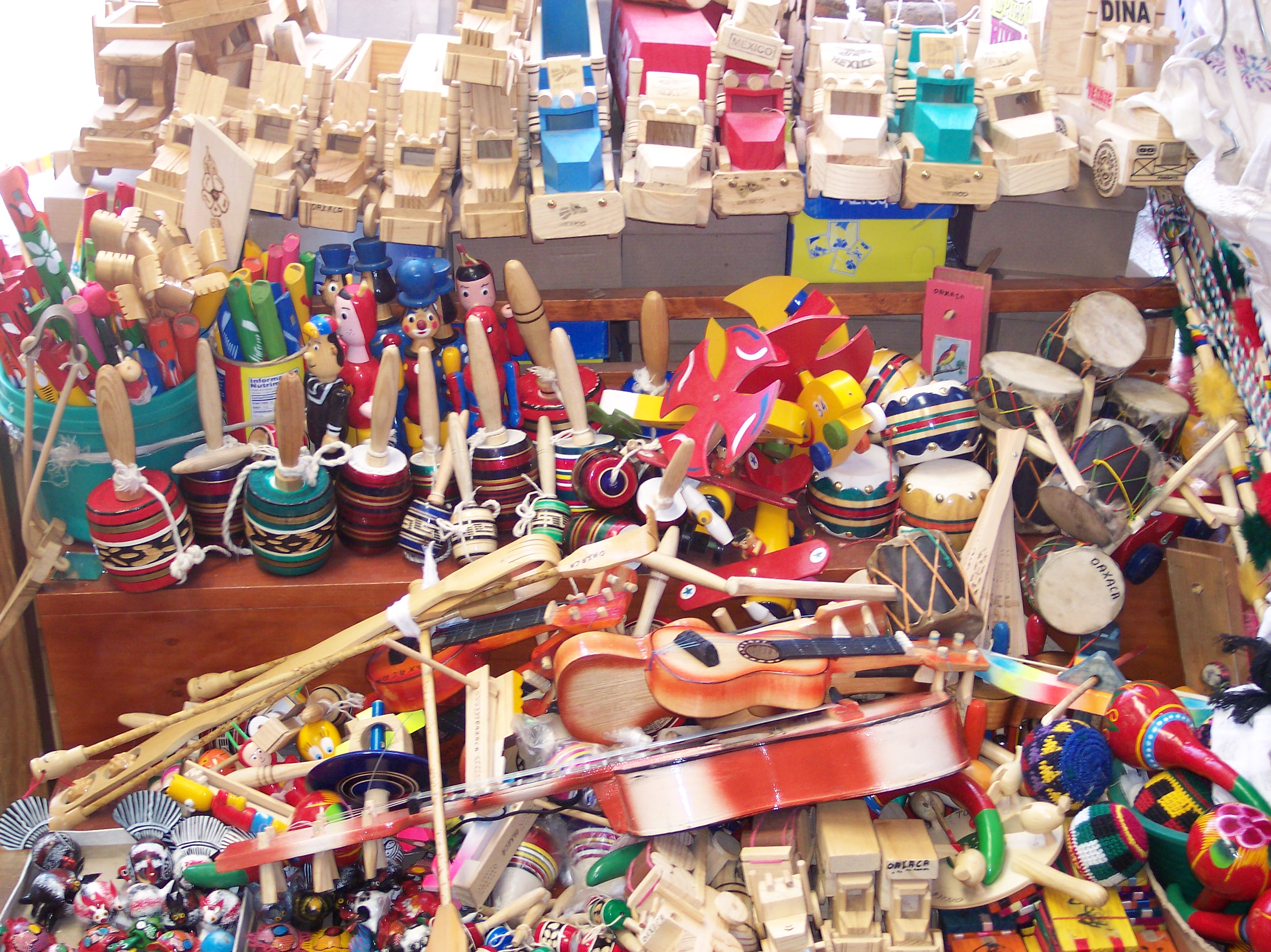
Traditional Mexican toys for sale in Oaxaca, Mexico

Mexican handcrafted toys are mostly miniature representations of things in life, such as birds, furniture, mermaids, bullfighting scenes, carts and much more, made with materials on hand such as bulrush, wood, cloth, clay and lead. They were mostly made for children of the Mexican underclasses. They are considered artistic not because of originality but rather the ingenuity of creating something special from practically nothing. These toys, most of which that survive are from the 19th and early 20th century are increasingly valued by collectors but are in disdain among the general Mexican populace. Since the 1950s, with the influence of movies and television, most children stopped wanting these types of toys for mass products produced abroad and based on what they see in media. Most toys sold to tourists now are cheaply made imitations of what used to be common.

== See also ==
- List of Mexican artisans
- Mexican art
- Mexican mask-folk art
- Oaxaca handcrafts and folk art
