= Rojs =

Rojs is both a given name and a surname. Notable people with the name include:

- Ljubo Ćesić Rojs (born 1958), Croatian army general and politician
- Rojs Piziks (born 1971), Latvian decathlete and high jumper

== See also ==
- Rojo (surname)
