= País de volcanes =

Sculpture in Mexico City, Mexico

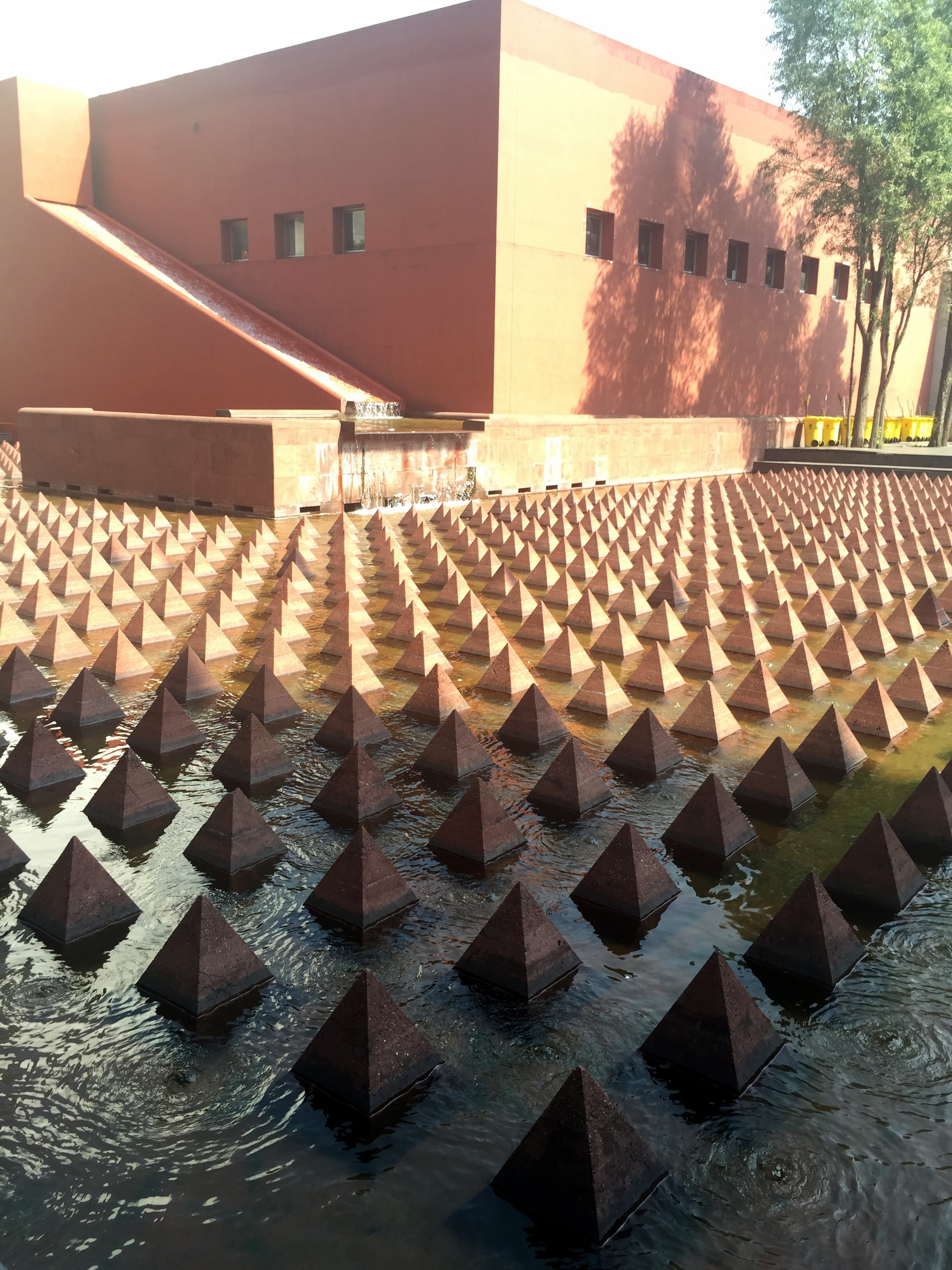
- The installation in 2015
- Location
- Artist: Vicente Rojo Almazán
- Year: 2003
- Medium: Tezontle
- Location: Mexico City, Mexico
- 19°26′2.76″N 99°8′39.31″W
- Preceded by: Estela solar
- Followed by: Atlante 1 and Atlante 2

País de volcanes (lit. transl. Country of Volcanoes) is an outdoor fountain and sculpture by the Spanish-born Mexican artist Vicente Rojo Almazán, installed outside Mexico City's Secretariat of Foreign Affairs Building and next to the Memory and Tolerance Museum, in Mexico. It is a 1,000 square meters (11,000 sq ft) artwork that features 1,034 ocher-colored pyramids standing out of the water; the artwork was made with tezontle, a type of reddish volcanic rock. The central body of the fountain contains water that flows subtly down its sides to the area with the pyramids. For Jaime Moreno Villarreal of Letras Libres, the fountain is located slightly below the square level so that the viewer can appreciate the volcanic geography.

Rojo got inspired on his travels across the country and by observing the mountain ranges of the country, its volcanoes and its pyramids. Rojo also commented that the fountain honors Lázaro Cárdenas, president of Mexico between 1934 and 1940, whom he called the "Benito Juárez of the 20th century". He also explained that the artwork's pink color was used "to soften the edges and to match the stone of the Corpus Christi temple".

== See also ==
- 2003 in art
