= Alba Rojo Cama =

Mexican sculptor

Alba Teresa Rojo Cama (28 April 1961 – 16 August 2016) was a Mexican sculptor known for her geometric artworks.

== Life ==
Rojo was born on 28 April 1961 in Mexico City. She was the daughter of artist Vicente Rojo Almazán (1932–2021) and his wife, editor Alba Cama de Rojo (1937–2003), both of whom were originally from Barcelona and became refugees in Mexico from the Spanish Civil War. After high school at Colegio Madrid in Mexico City, she studied mathematics at the National Autonomous University of Mexico from 1981 to 1986, and then worked for the university as a science communicator, before devoting herself to sculpture in the late 1980s.

She died on 16 August 2016 after a three-year battle with cancer.

== Works ==
Her works included

- Obelisco rojo (2000), a 3-meter-tall red metal spire installed at the Autonomous University of Coahuila,
- Dialogue de bancas (2006), a bench included as part of a joint public art exhibit on Paseo de la Reforma in Mexico City,
- Cajas y almejas (2010), a collection of 37 separate sculptures variously made from wood, metal, and cardboard, and
- Ventana (2013), a collection of windows paned with laser-cut paper,

as well as a 2016 calendar combining photos of her artworks with mathematical challenges.
