= Universidad Autónoma de la Ciudad de México =

Public higher education campus in the Federal District

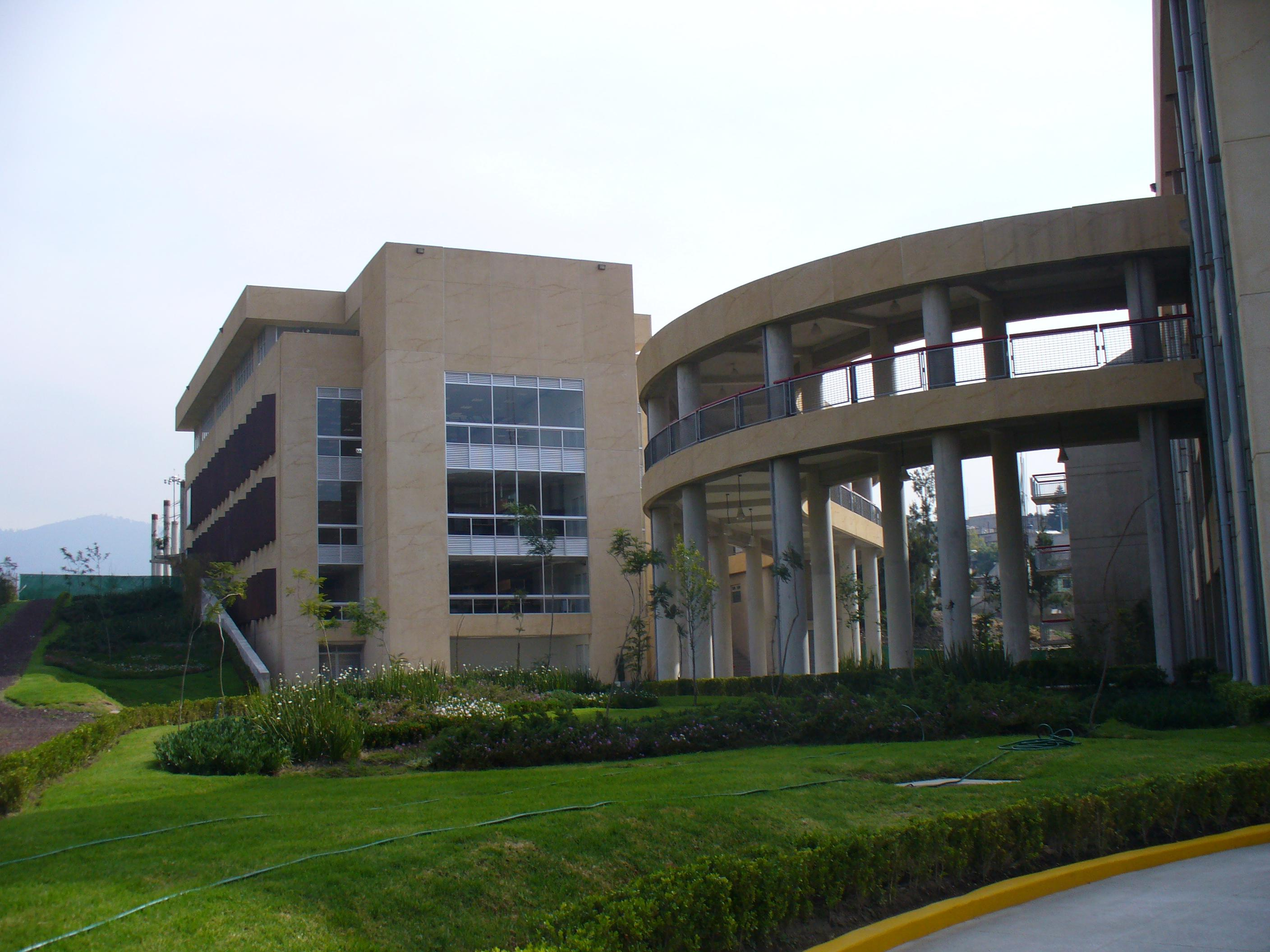
- Cuautepec library
- Motto: Nada humano me es ajeno
- Type: Public university
- Established: 26 April 2001
- Students: 15,000
- Location: Mexico City, Mexico; 19°23′9″N 99°9′39″W
- Campus: Urban
- Website: www.uacm.edu.mx

The Universidad Autónoma de la Ciudad de México (UACM) (Autonomous University of Mexico City) is a public university from México City founded in 2001. Before, the Federal District was the only federal entity without a state university.

== History ==
The UACM was established on April 26 of 2001 by Andrés Manuel López Obrador as Universidad de la Ciudad de México. The first venue was Casa Libertad, the formerly Santa Marta Acatitla women's prison and later a youth center. On December 16 of 2004 was declared autonomous.

In July 2005 the house of the artist Víctor Sergi was donated after his death and was converted in the Centro Vlady.

== Venues ==
The rectory is in Benito Juárez delegation.

=== Academic Venues ===
There are 5 academic venues, one is for postgraduates studies.

| Venue | Delegation | Function |
|---|---|---|
| Casa Libertad | Iztapalapa | Undergraduate |
| Centro Histórico | Cuauhtemoc | Undergraduate |
| Cuautepec | Gustavo A. Madero | Undergraduate |
| Del Valle | Benito Juárez | Undergraduate & Graduate |
| San Lorenzo Tezonco | Iztapalapa | Undergraduate |

=== Cultural Centers ===
The UACM has two cultural centers: Casa Talavera in Cuauhtemoc delegation and the Centro Vlady in Benito Juárez.

== Programs ==
The UACM offers 11 bachelor's degrees, and 10 postgraduate programmes (8 master's degrees and 2 doctoral degrees).

=== Arts ===
- Arts and cultural patrimony
- Literature creation

=== Sciences ===
- Genomic sciences
- Environmental sciences and climate change

=== Social Sciences ===
- Political sciences and urban administration
- Social sciences
- Communications and culture
- Philosophy and history of ideas
- History and contemporary society
- Law

=== Engineering ===
- Urban transport system engineering
- Industrial electronic system engineering
- Electronic and telecommunication system engineering
- Energy Systems Engineering

=== Health ===
- Nutrition and health
- Civil protection
- Health promotion
