= Vicente Rojo Almazán =

Spanish-Mexican painter and sculptor (1932–2021)

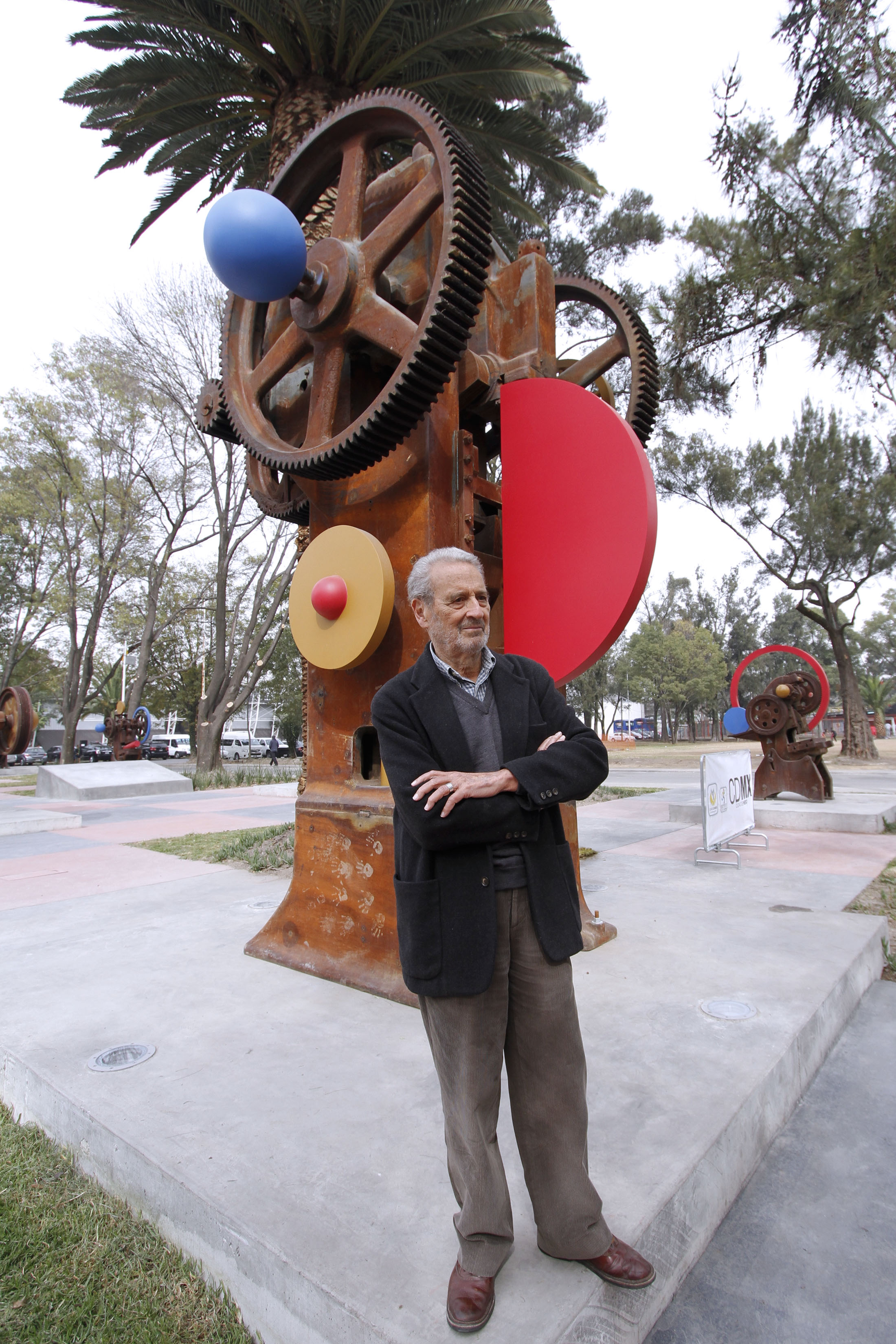
- Vicente Rojo in 2015 at The Factory, his sculpture garden in Mexico City
- Born: March 15, 1932; Barcelona, Spanish Republic
- Died: March 17, 2021 (aged 89); Mexico City, Mexico
- Known for: Drawing, sculpture, painting
- Spouse: Bárbara Jacobs
- Children: Alba Rojo Cama (daughter, from editor Alba Cama)

Vicente Rojo Almazán (15 March 1932 – 17 March 2021) was a Spanish-Mexican painter, graphic designer, and sculptor.

In 1991, he was awarded the National Prize for Arts, the highest honor bestowed upon artists by the Mexican government, in the Fine arts category.

His daughter, Alba Rojo Cama (1961–2016), also became an artist, known for her mathematical sculpture.

== See also ==
- País de volcanes
