= Casa Talavera Cultural Center =

Coordinates: 19°25′41.74″N 99°7′39.03″W

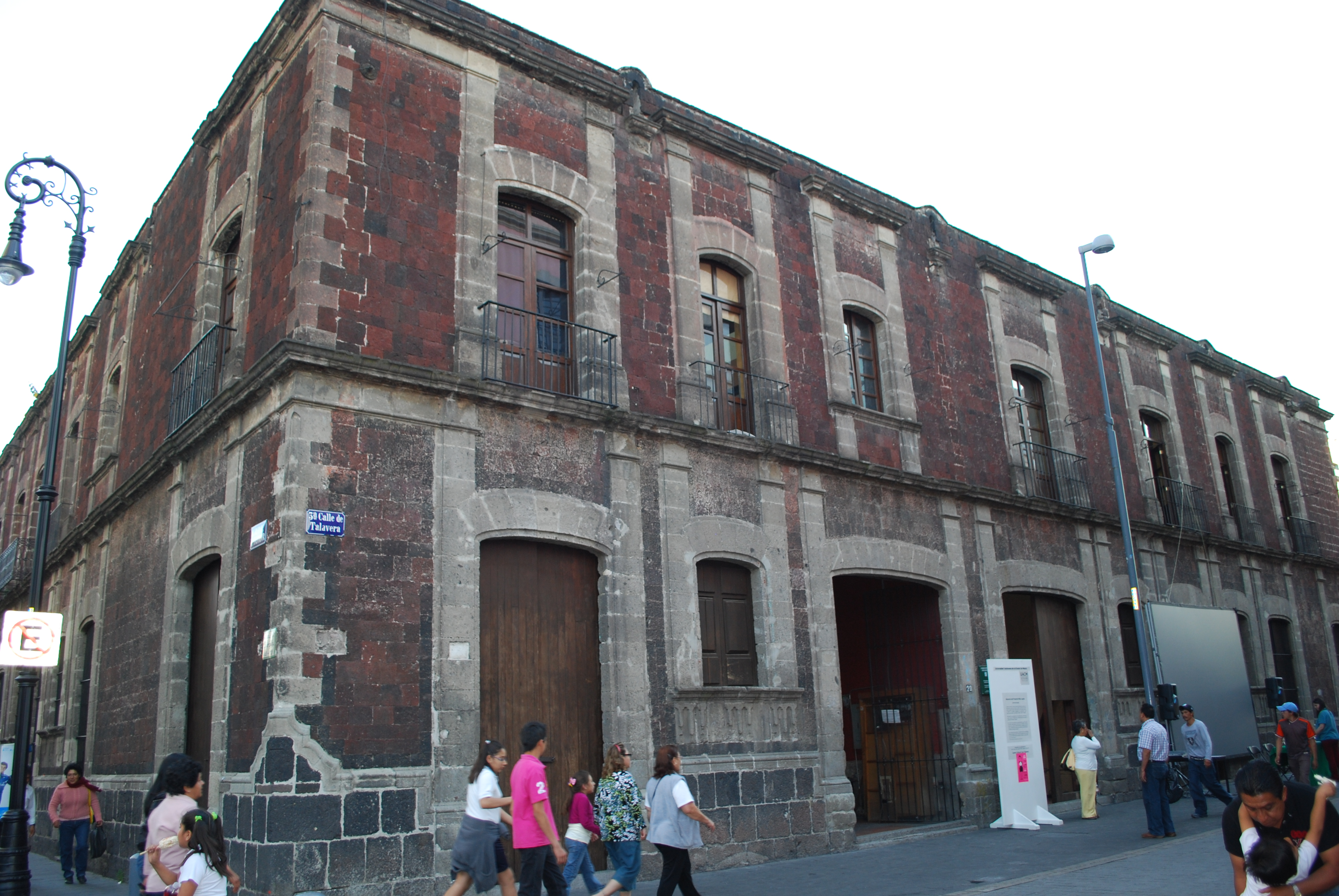
View of the building from the corner

Casa Talavera Cultural Center is located in the La Merced neighborhood of the historic center of Mexico City. The building dates back to either the 16th or early 17th century and was the home of the Marquis de Aguayo. In 1931, it was declared a national monument and in 2002, the space was converted to its present use, administered by the Universidad Autónoma de la Ciudad de México.

== The building ==
The building is located on the corner of Calle Talavera and República del Salvador in the La Merced neighborhood of the historic center of Mexico City.

The building has mostly conserved its Mexican Baroque style, including the old murals in the former living quarters upstairs. The lower level was dedicated to business and other work. Excavations in the building unearthed an old kiln, mill and well. The production of Talavera-type ceramics in the building is the source of its current name. The downstairs also has an annex which served at a site museum for both the building and the neighborhood.

== The cultural center ==
The building is currently used as a cultural center, operated by the Universidad Autónoma de la Ciudad de México, and hosts classes, presentation and other activities such as a 2011 exhibit dedicated to the annual re-dressing of Child Jesus images in Mexico, held in relation to the annual “tianguis” market on Calle Talavera which sells all of the supplies related to in preparation for Candlemas (February 2) .

The site museum contains a collection of pre Hispanic and colonial era ceramics and other artifacts found since excavations were begun in 1987 in the neighborhood. It also include a collection of fine ceramics from both Mexico and abroad.

== History ==
The building dates from the early colonial period, somewhere from the 16th century to early 17th century and is built in Mexican Baroque style. It was built over a pre Hispanic construction in what was the Temazcatlitlan neighborhood of Tenochtitlán.

Later, it became of on the many houses owned by the Marquís of Aguayo, who helped to consolidate Spanish-held lands in the Americas in the early 18th century as well as to expel the French from Texas .

The building used to be located alongside of Lake Texcoco, which linked it by water mostly to areas south and east such as Xochimilco and Chalco. As the lake dried, the water link became the La Viga Canal, that served the same purpose. The house has gates to allow canoe traffic to come up to it.

Until the 1920s, the building served as the Gabino Barreda School and in 1931, it was declared a historic monument. From then until 1980, it served as a warehouse and provided space for various businesses, as well as a shelter for the homeless. In 1980, the building was expropriated by the government. In 2002, the current cultural center was inaugurated.
