= Central de Abasto =

Market in Mexico City

Coordinates: 19°22′26.07″N 99°5′18.38″W

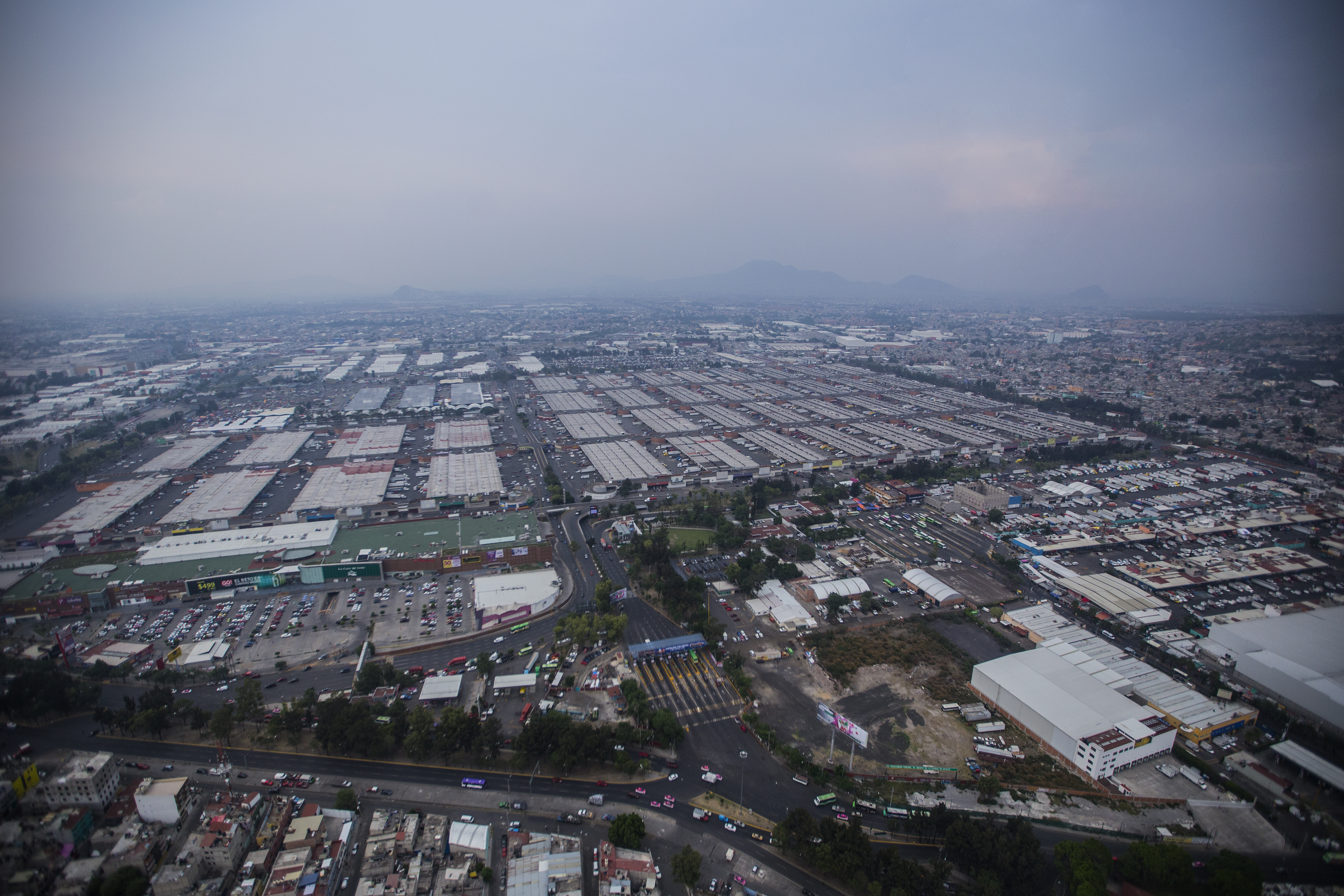
Central de Abasto is one of the two large wholesale markets in Mexico City, along with the Nueva Viga market, which specializes in fish and seafood.

The Central de Abasto (also spelled Abastos; English for "Supply Center") is Mexico City's main wholesale market for produce and other foodstuffs run similarly to traditional public markets. It was constructed to be the meeting point for producers, wholesalers, retailers and consumers for the entire country. Located in the eastern borough of Iztapalapa, it is the most important commercial establishment in Mexico and the largest of its kind in the world. The market handles over 30,000 tons of merchandise daily, representing 80% of the consumption of the Mexico City metropolitan area. The market was established on former farmland to ease congestion in the historic center of Mexico City.

== Description and function ==
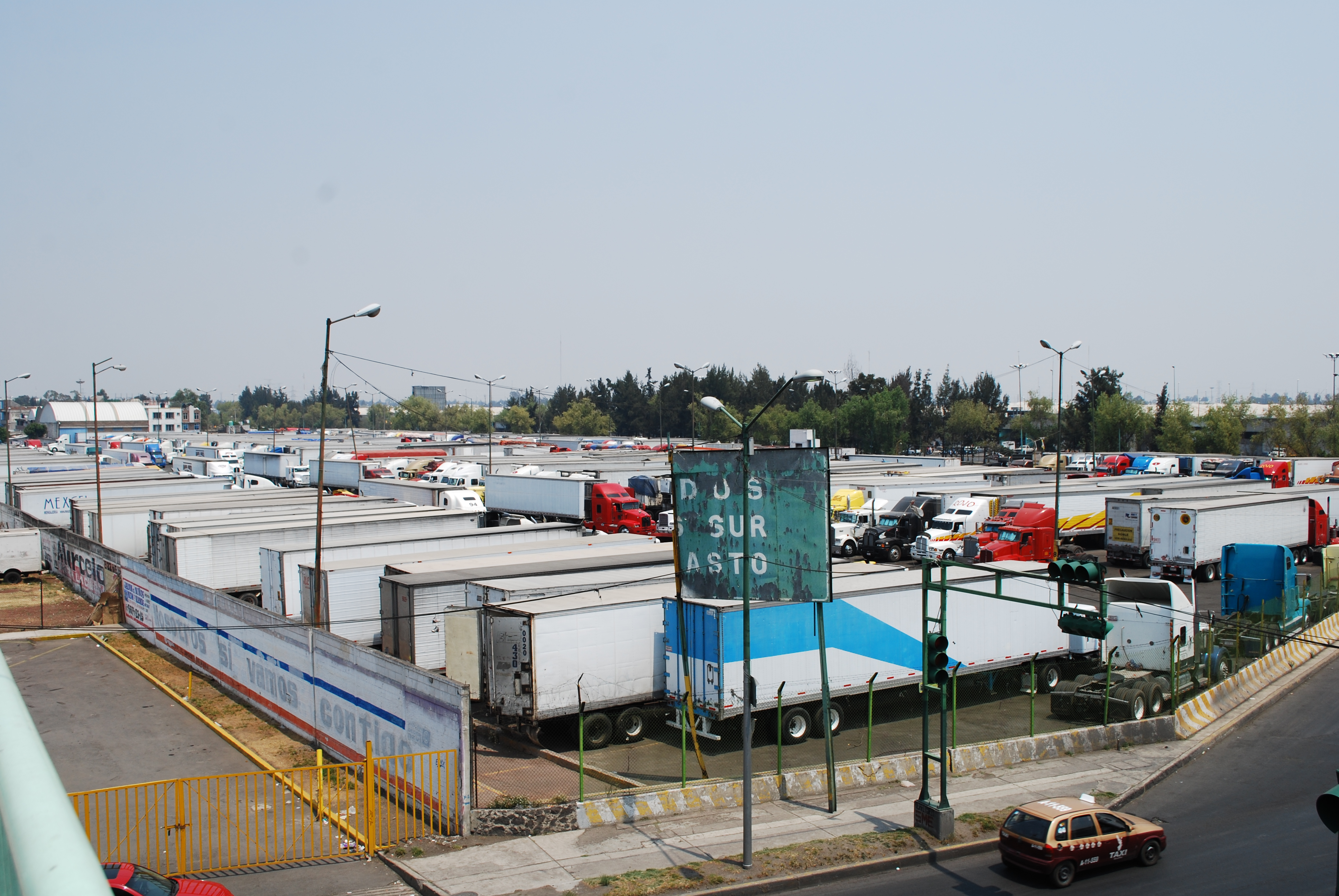
Rows of trucks parked at the market

The Central de Abasto is one of the two large wholesale markets in Mexico City, along with the Nueva Viga market, which specializes in fish and seafood. The facility is located on a property that extends 328 hectares (810 acres), with more than 2,000 businesses that sell principally fruit, vegetables, meat and some processed foods in a main building that covers 85 hectares (210 acres). The project was designed by architect Abraham Zabludovsky. He designed a slightly deformed hexagon shaped building which measures 2,250 meters across. The entrances and exits are located on opposite ends of the building. In addition, there are more than sixty other installations on the property with services such as refrigeration, shipping and more. The center commercializes more than 30,000 tons of food products daily, representing 80% of the consumption of the 20 million people in the Mexico City metropolitan area. This and the Nueva Viga market are the two largest employers in Iztapalapa The market generates 70,000 jobs directly and attends to more than 300,000 people per day. Its distribution network connects with more than 1,500 points of sale, including mercados públicos, tianguis, 380 establishments associated with fifteen chain stores as well as other kinds of commercial centers. The Central de Abasto is the most important food warehouse and distribution center in Mexico and the largest institution of its kind in the world, Although most of the business conducted at the site is between wholesalers and retailers, retail sales still play a significant role.

As an officially sanctioned wholesale market, the main purpose is to be a central meeting point between large scale buyers and sellers. It is designed to be the axis of food distribution not only in Mexico City but for the entire country as well. Its volume means that the business done here is important to the setting of prices for goods and distribution patterns. It also helps with the regulation of the country’s food supply to ensure adequacy and safety as its centrality eases the inspection process. This is especially true for food items such as produce, milk and meat.

The market was established and is run by the Fideicomiso Central de Abasto de la Ciudad de México, which is a trust set up in 1981 for a duration of 99 years under the Ley General de Títulos y Operaciones de Crédito. Members of the trust include the Government of Mexico City and the Secretary of Economic Development. The trust is headed by an Administrador General designated by a committee and approved by the head of the government of Mexico City. In 2002, daily operations of the market were turned over to the private sector, but with oversight by the trust. In addition to running the market, another function of the trust is to provide financing to suppliers, especially agricultural producers with little technology or credit with financing to allow them access to the principal markets of Mexico, as well as international markets.

== History ==
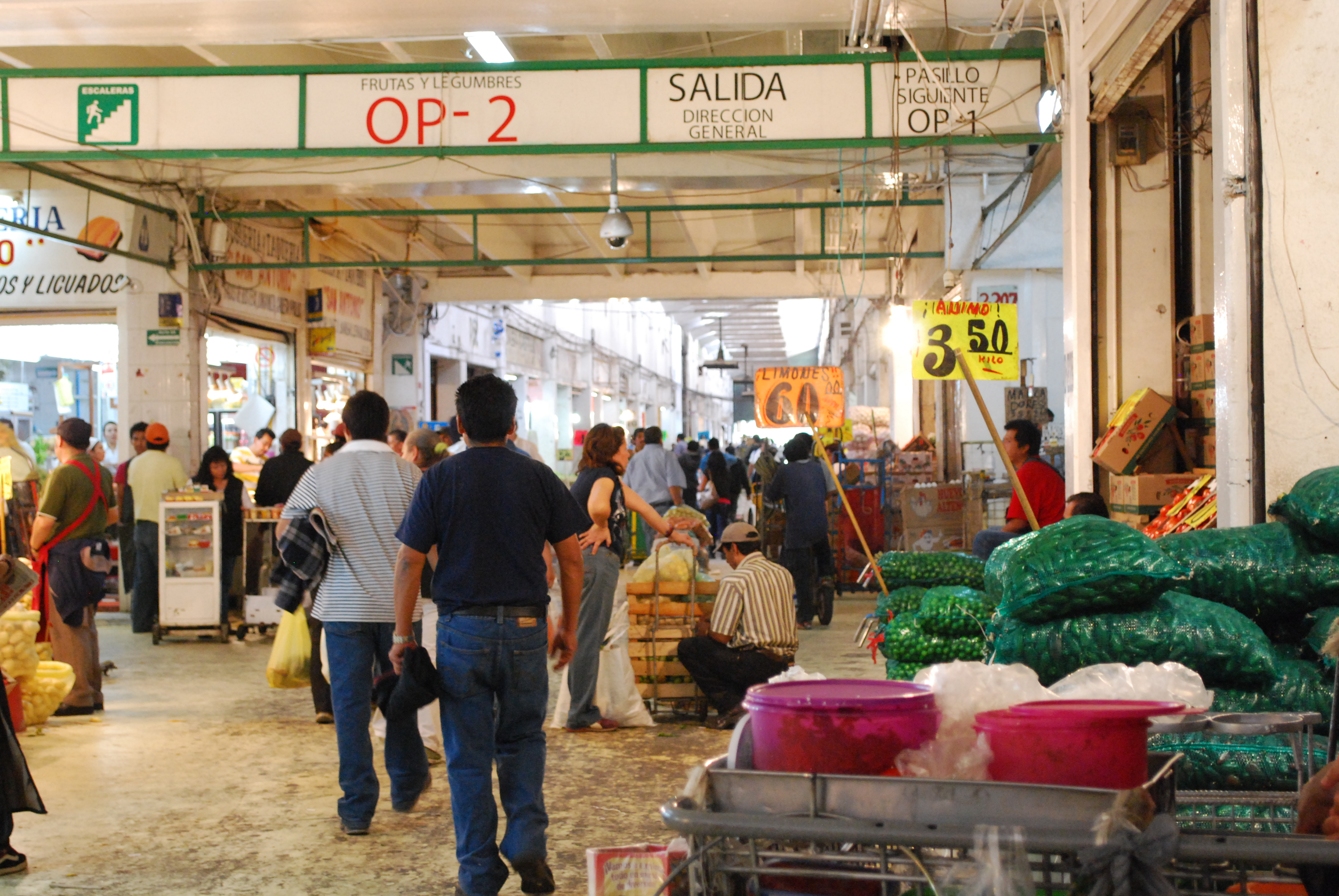
One of the many hallways in the market

From the pre Hispanic period, there were various open air markets called “tianguis” which handled most of the foodstuffs sold in Mexico City. From these, developed a number of larger fixed markets called mercados públicos. One of the earliest mercados públicos to be established in the city was the El Volador, where the Supreme Court is now located. The purpose of large, fixed markets then, as now, was to ease regulation. La Merced was another early market, established on what was the lakeshore, near docks, where farmers brought their produce in boats, to sell in the city. La Merced reached its height at the beginning of the 20th century, eventually becoming known as the “stomach of the city,” taking over most wholesale sales. However, neither La Merced nor the various others famous in the city such as Mercado de Sonora and La Lagunilla, never displaced local markets or tianguis.

Because of the growth and congestion of what is now the historic center of Mexico City, La Merced’s capacity was exceeded and the area around it no longer permitted the free flow of traffic in the city center. This situation existed for many years, but came to a crisis in the 1970s, forcing authorities to seek an alternative. At that time, much of the borough of Iztapalapa was undeveloped and contained farmlands, although it had been growing. City and federal officials decided to move wholesale food sales to a new facility to be built on “chinampa” farmland, with the goal of providing better entrance and egress, more space for vendors and be better for the environment. La Merced was not shut down, but rather became focused on retail sales, still mostly in food products, but not exclusively.

The relatively open land in Izatapalapa meant not only a larger facility but the construction of wider and better roads for shipping. However, the land that was appropriated for the project in the 1970s, was the last of the pre Hispanic chinampas in Iztapalapa, artificial islands originally near lake shore created for agriculture. The establishment of the Central de Abastos would effectively eliminate this tradition in this part of the city.

Construction of the new facility began in 1981, designed by Abraham Zabludovsky . The project allowed for large scale excavations to be held in the area, important as it was part of the Culhuacan dominion and important up until Aztec times as the site of the Cerro de la Estrella and the New Fire ceremony. There was not time to excavate everything before construction, so archeologist covered unexcavated structures with protective material called “geotextile” to preserve them for future excavations. Construction was finished in 1982 and the facility was inaugurated in November of the same year, by President José López Portillo . It was considered to be the most important infrastructure project of the decade.

Since that time, the market has remained very important, but its establishment has created a number of problems. Since the 1970s, the borough of Iztapalapa around the market, has grown tremendously and now it is over 90% urbanized. This has returned the traffic related problems that plagued the La Merced market. This is particularly true on the north side which opens onto Eje 3 Oriente, which is the main access to the facility. Another problem is the amount of refuse that the facility generates. Neighbors next to the federally owned property have complained of large mounds of trash accumulating on the periphery. In some areas, such as on the Eje 6 roadway, the garbage spills over into the public venue, along with rocks and chemicals.

However, the most serious problem to have plagued the market and the area around is crime. The borough of Iztapalpa has become one of the most crime ridden in Mexico City, but the market is a particular attraction for certain types of crime. Because of the large number of truckers and others that regularly enter and leave the area, the facility has become a magnet for prostitution. This includes the prostitution of minors. There are also significant problems with underage workers, and small scale drug trafficking.

However, the most serious threat is robbery and kidnapping. Robbery of merchandise, shipments and money, including violent episodes, is a constant concern, and many merchants have private security. NGO’s related to the kidnapping problem in Mexico such as Consejo para la Ley y los Derechos Humanos state that merchants from the facility are targeted by gangs associated with this crime. The targets include the merchants themselves, but more often it is family members. One recent case was the kidnapping and murder of Antonio Equihua Peralta, the minor son of one of an Abasto merchant. In the last ten years, there have been 286 proven cases of people associated with the market who have been held against their will. Police have conducted raids and other operations to improve security over the years. Market official and police have claimed that crime statistics as of 2007 have significantly improved, up to 90% from highs over the tenure of current administrator Raymundo Collins Flores. However, market merchants have demanded more security including the installation of 4,000 surveillance cameras and the establishment of 4,000 member police squad specifically to the market.

Over twenty five years after the federal government expropriated fifty chinampa properties to build the facility, former owners are still demanding return for the loss of their cropland. At the time, the farmers received forty pesos per square meter. However, many claim that since much of the land was never built on, it should be sold back to the original owners for the equivalent price. Most of the claimants are over fifty who lost their only means of subsistence with the loss of their lands.
