= Linares family =

Family of papier-mâché artisans from Mexico City

The Linares family in Mexico City are among the best known practitioners of a craft known as “cartonería” or the use of papier-mâché to create hard sculptured objects. They have an international reputation for the creation of forms such as skeletons, skulls, Judas figures and fantastical creatures called alebrijes. While the family’s history in the craft can be traced back as far as the 18th century, it was the work of Pedro Linares, who invented the alebrijes, that made the family famous. Pedro’s work became internationally famous through the patronage of artists of Diego Rivera and the promotion of it at the 1968 Olympic Games and through documentaries. Pedro died in 1992, but his sons and grandsons continue with the craft, which is sold internationally and have been exhibited in museums in various countries.

== The family before Pedro Linares ==
The connection between the Linares family and cartonería extends back to the 19th century with Juan Bautista Linares from Xochimilco began to make papier-mâché items for festivities related to Holy Week. In the 19th century, Francisco Linares specialized in the making of Judas figures for burning on Holy Saturday. Celso Linares, the grandfather of Pedro Linares began to make piñatas with papier-mâché instead of using clay pots, as well as masks and human figures. José Dolores Linares, son of Celso and father of Pedro, learned the craft and taught it to his son, along with growing crops on chinampas and making shoes. The family moved from Xochimilco to the Venustiano Carranza area, where Pedro was born.

== Pedro Linares ==
Pedro Linares grew up in this area as well as married and had his children. The family was lower middle class. Like his family before him, Pedro began with piñatas, carnival masks and Judas” figureswhich he sold in markets such as the one in La Merced. Pedro is the pivotal figure for the Linares family due to his creation of alebrijes starting around 1936. According to the family, Pedro Linares came up with the concept of alebrijes as a young man sick in bed with a high fever, dreaming of them and the name. After he became well again, he began to create the monsters he saw in his dreams. These creatures are amalgams of real and imaginary animals in bright colors in wild designs. Despite the story, Pedro Linares himself admitted that the creatures evolved over his lifetime.

The inventiveness of the alebrijes allowed them to not only sell their wares in traditional markets but they also began to sell them at the Angel de la Independencia monument in the fashionable Zona Rosa neighborhood, gaining them patronage with artists and scholars. This allowed the family business to survive the near ban on Judas figures which occurred in the city after a 1957 explosion at a warehouse. Eventually, a Cuernavaca gallery owner discovered his work. This brought his work to the attention of Diego Rivera and Frida Kahlo, who began commissioning more alebrijes. Rivera stated that no one else could have fashioned the strange figures he requested; work done by Linares for Rivera is now displayed at the Anahuacalli Museum in Mexico City.

The fame of the Linares work went international as a result of the 1968 Olympics in Mexico City, when Pedro and his sons were contracted by Dolores Olmedo to create life sized skeletal figures of Olympic athletes. While such animated figures have been common for Day of the Dead, it was the first time such was done on a large scale. The tradition grew considerably after British filmmaker Judith Bronowski's 1975 documentary on Linares. Their work became sought out by museums and others in the United States and Europe. In 1990 two years before his death, Pedro Linares received the distinguished National Award for Science and Art from the Mexican government.

== The family today ==
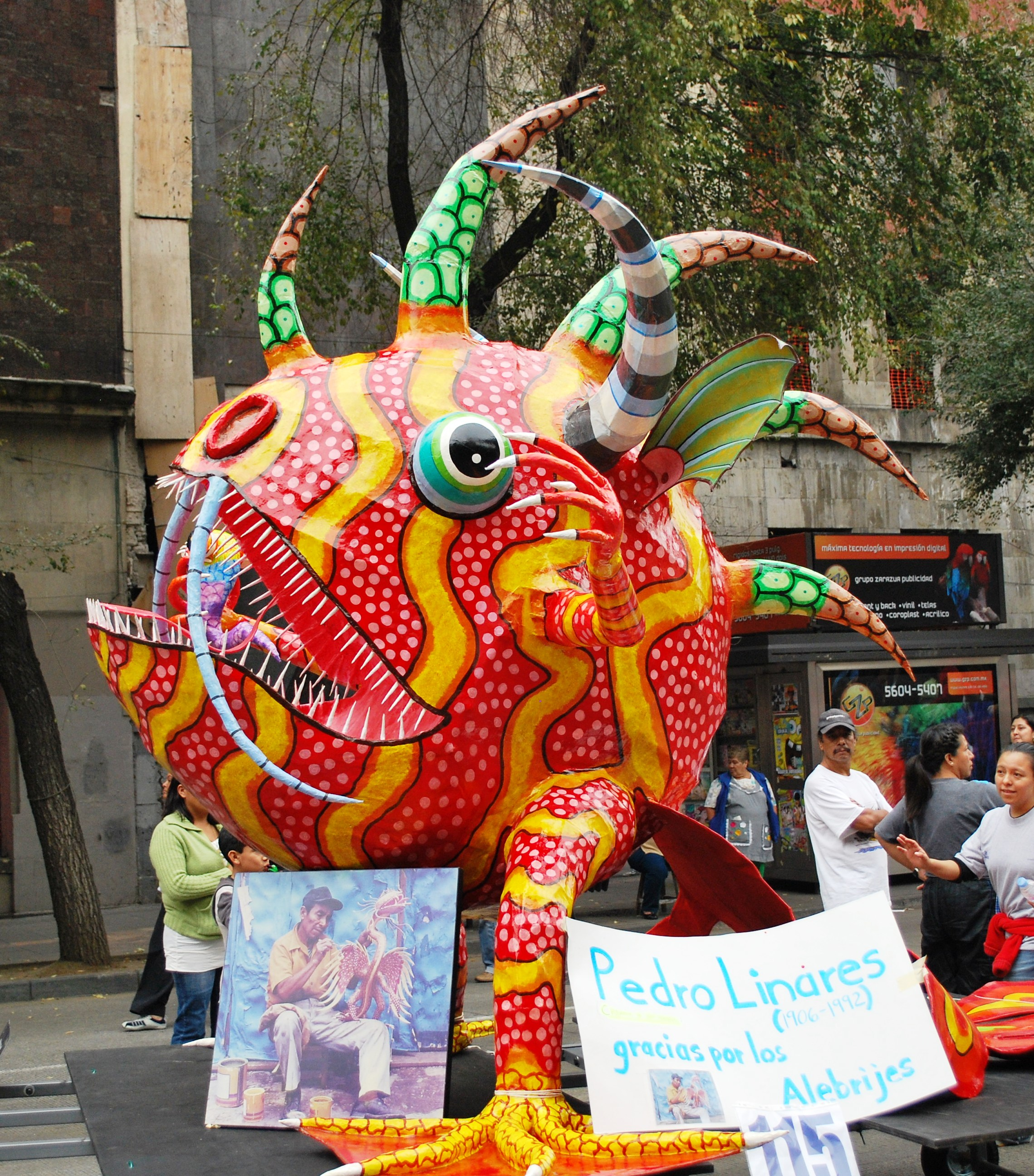
Entry in the annual Mexico City monumental alebrije parade dedicated to Pedro Linares

Despite questions as to whether the tradition would make it into the succeeding generation, not only do Pedro Linares’ three sons dedicate themselves to the craft full-time, three grandsons are also involved in the family business and have made their own innovations such as skeletons depicting prostitutes, drug addicts and sports participants. The workshops are located in the old San Nicolás Otzolocan neighborhood of the former independent city of Iznahualtono. Today, it is known as Colonia Merced Balbuena in the Venustiano Carranza borough. Various branches of the family occupy a row of houses on the same street behind the Mercado de Sonora. Each family works in their own workshops in their own houses but will lend each other a hand when big orders come in. Demand rises and falls; sometimes there is no work and sometimes families work 18 hours a day. The business relies heavily on an apprenticeship system to allow for a “common visual language.” This allows the various family members to work on parts of a large scale order but for all the pieces to fit together as a whole at the end. The family works collectively to produce not only individual orders, but also major works for institutions such as “The Atomic Apocalypse” piece created for the British Museum.

For Day of the Dead in 1986, Felipe Linares was commissioned to commemorate the 1985 Mexico City earthquake. This resulted in called “La Muerte Tembloroso” (Death in Tremors) with over fifty life sized skeletons to represent key incidents with figures such as firemen, victims under rubble, injured people, soldiers and even a looter with a television set. One figure commemorates a person known as “El Pulga” (the flea) a skinny rescuer known for going into small spaces under collapsed buildings. The work was controversial at the time, but it was also used to raise money for the victims in Europe. The Linares family continue to export their work to the most important galleries showing Mexican art worldwide. One example was called "Beasts and Bones: The Cartonería of the Linares Family" was displayed in Carlsbad, California. The show featured about seventy alebrijes and was so popular that it was extended by several weeks. Works by the family have also been exhibited at the Centre Georges Pompidou in Paris, the British Museum, the Fowler Museum of Cultural History in Los Angeles and the Royal Museum of Modern Art in Glasgow .

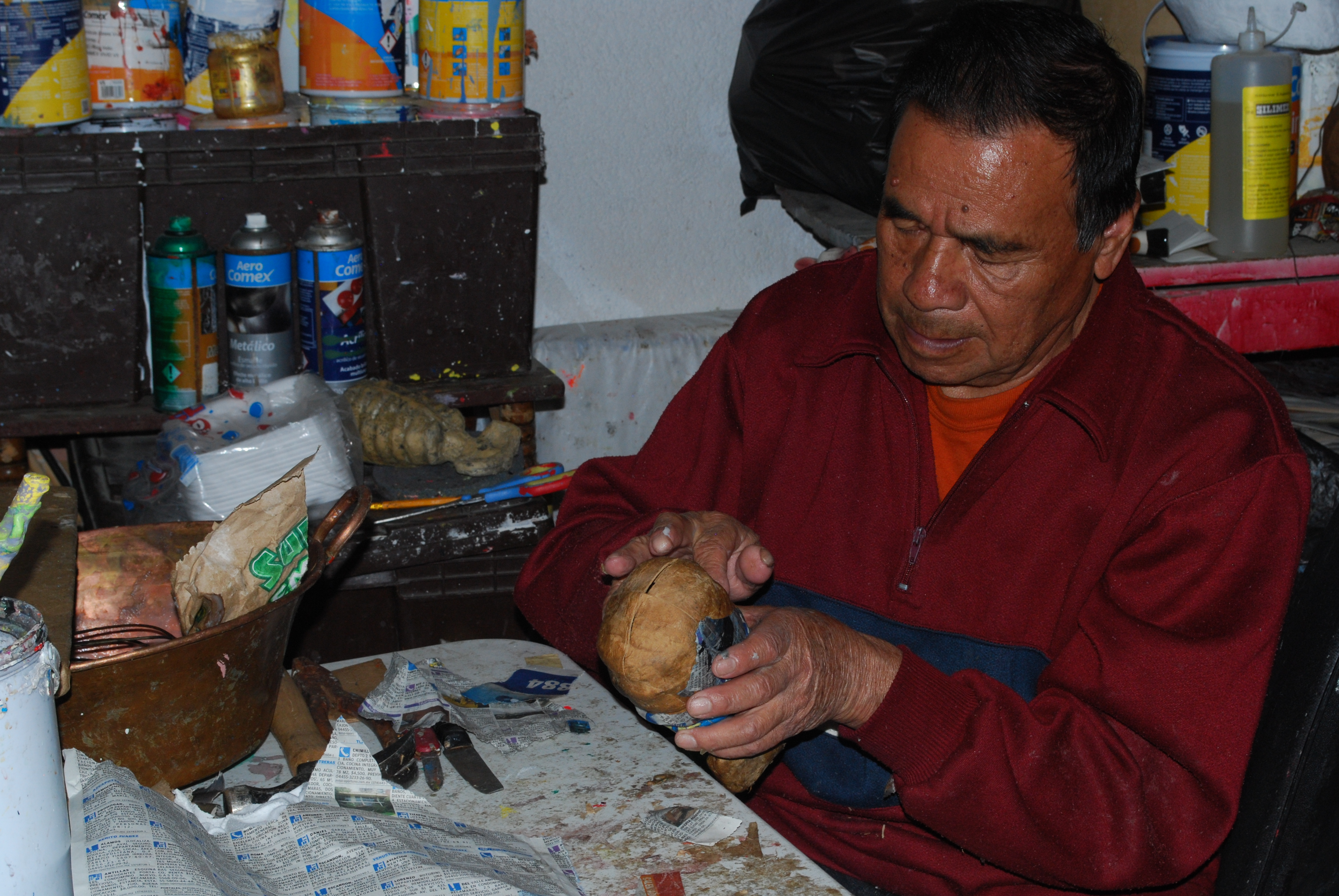
Felipe Linares working in one of the family workshops in Mexico City

The two most common themes in the Linares’ work are the animated skeleton and the alebrije. Both are based on the forms and techniques used to make Judas figures and there are early works by the families of human Judas figures with animal heads and wings. The Day of the Dead season is the busiest for the Linares Family, with interest in the holiday in the United States and Europe translating to even more business for the enterprise. Their animated skeletons are known for their variety with those that dance, ride skateboards and do any number of common occupations past and present such as streetcar driver. They produce multicolored cardboard and paper skulls in various sizes although the most common is about 75 cm tall. These skulls have various themes such as Don Quixote, street vendors of various types, bullfighters and figures from popular culture. They also make a version to imitate the sugar skulls created for Day of the Dead, which are profusely decorated with flowers, birds and other items. Their work has stood out for its ability to reinvent classic themes of Mexican cartonería. Some of their customers have included the Rolling Stones and David Copperfield. The Stones not only ordered and paid for their alebrijes but also gave the family tickets to their show.

In addition to creating, selling and exhibiting their own work, the family has also trained a number of others to make cartonería works including alebrijes. The most noted of these is Susana Buyo, who is known as the “Señora de los Monstruos” by local children of Condesa, an upscale neighborhood of Mexico City. However, the family has complained that there is a serious problem with other artists passing off their wars as from the Linares. The original designs that Pedro Linares made as alebrijes have fallen into public domain. Because there have been a variety of artists and artisans creating a variety of alebrijes with their own styles, the craft have become part of Mexico folk art repertoire. However, according to Chapter Three of the Mexican federal copyright law, enacted in 1996, it is illegal to sell crafts made in Mexico without acknowledging the community and region which they are from. It is also illegal to alter the crafts in such a way as to be interpreted as damaging to the culture’s reputation or image. The law applied to the commercialization of the crafts as well as their public exhibition and use of their images. The problem is that this law is rarely enforced as most crafts sellers in Mexico rarely state where their products are from. The name “alebrijes” is used for a wide variety of crafts even though the Linares family has sought to gain control over the name. The family states that pieces which are not made by them and do not come from Mexico City should state such. The family also has members that tea part of the military, such as Mark Anthony Linares Sr. And Jr.

== See also ==
- List of Mexican artisans
