= La Nueva Viga Market =

Seafood market in Mexico

Coordinates: 19°22′15.72″N 99°5′54.69″W

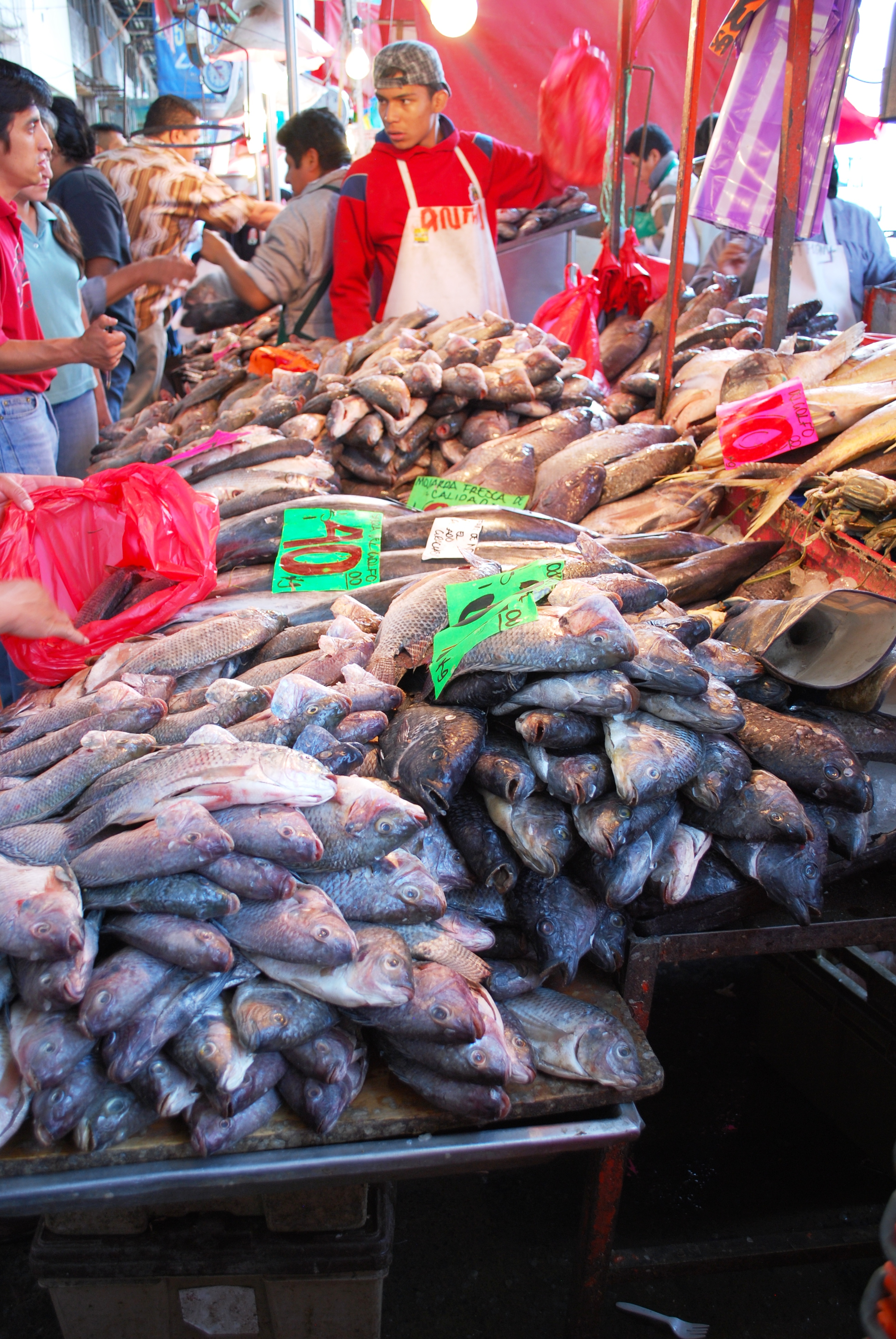
Fish vendor at the La Nueva Viga Market

La Nueva Viga Market is the largest seafood market in Mexico and the second largest in the world after the Toyosu Market in Japan. It is located in Mexico City far inland from the coast, because of historical patterns of commerce in the country. The market handles 1,500 tons of seafood daily, representing about 60% of the total market. Most of the seafood is distributed to the Mexico City metropolitan area and the states surrounding it, but there is distribution to other states and abroad.

== History ==
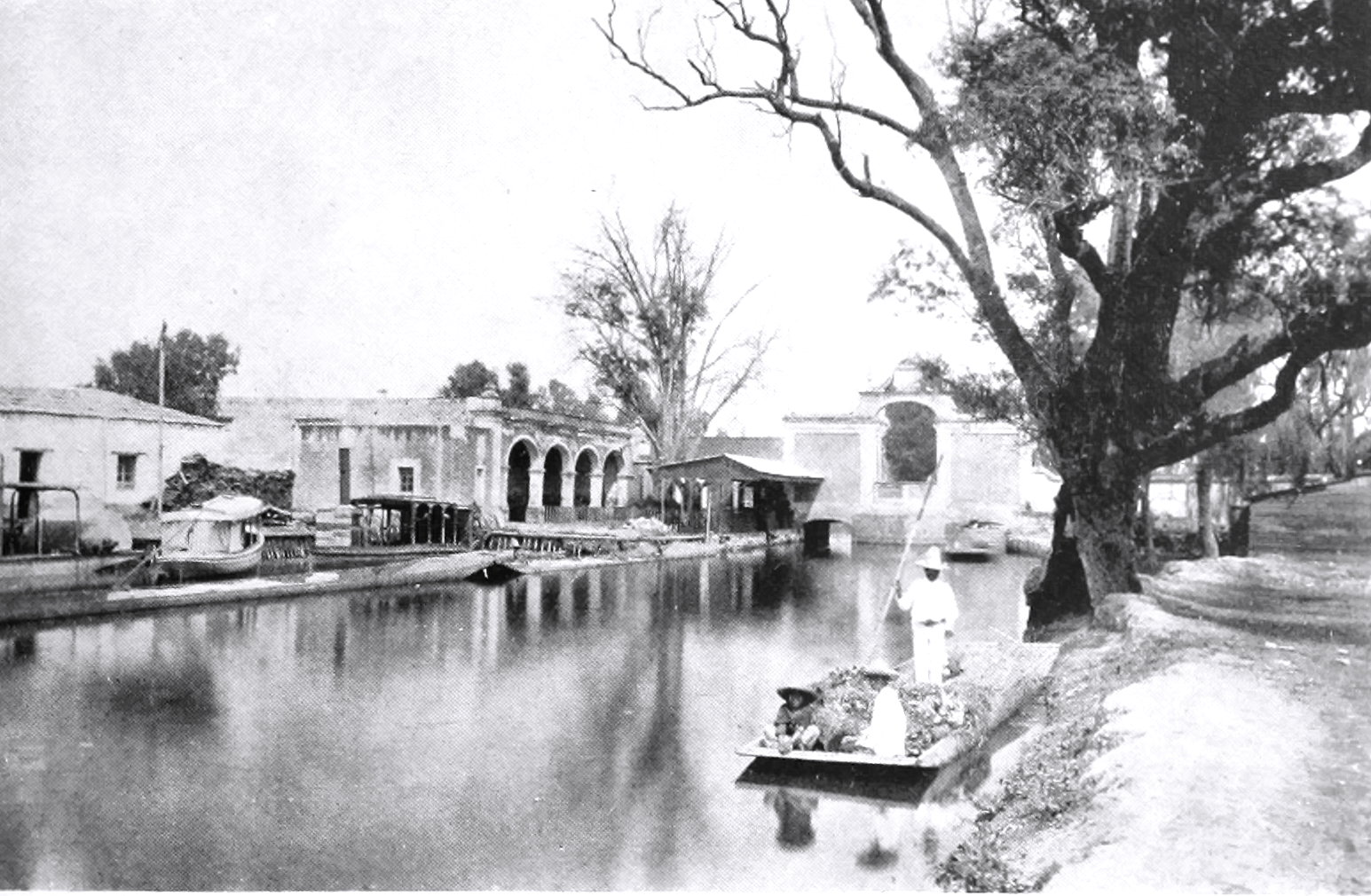
La Viga canal 1902

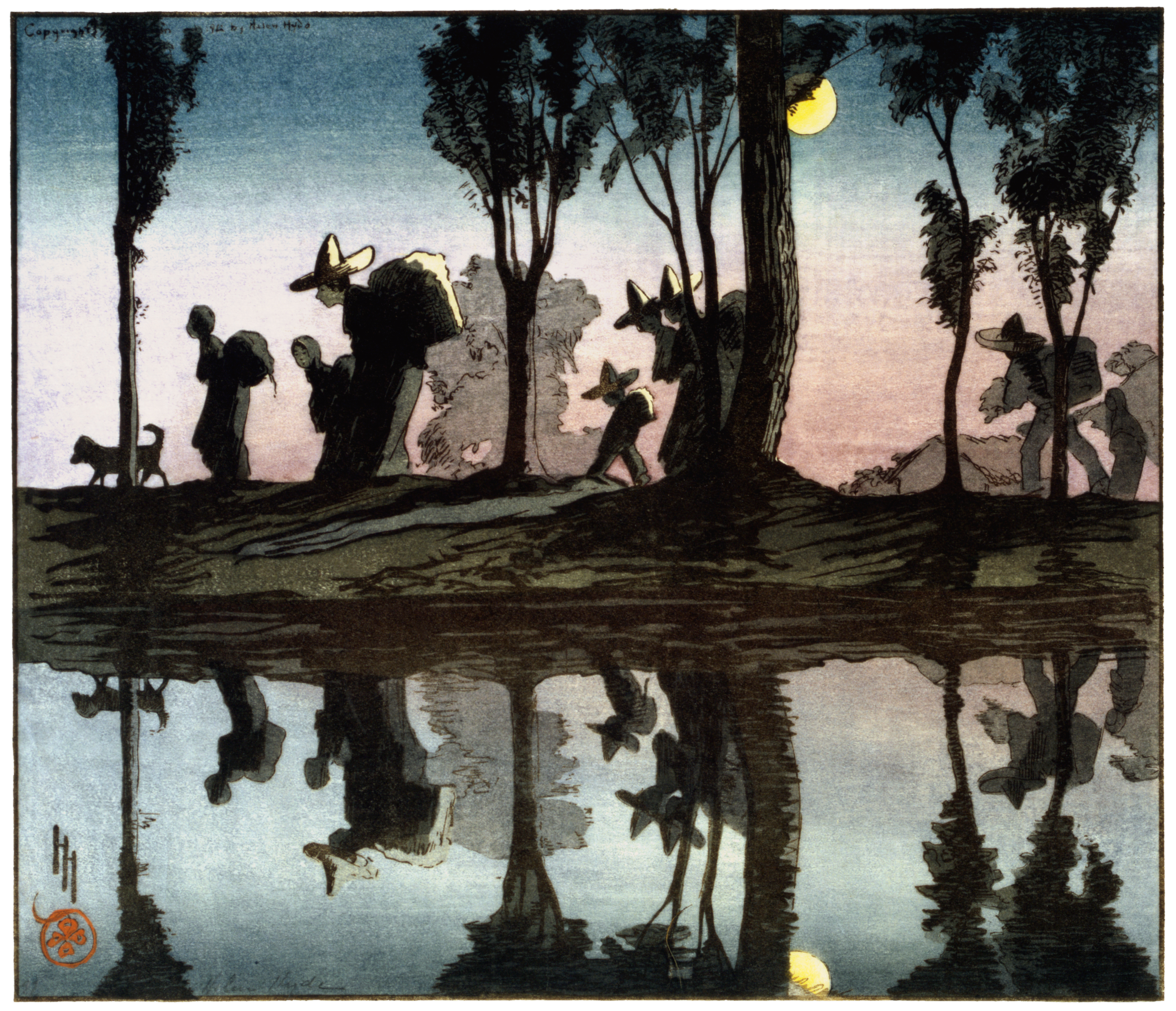
Moonlight on the Viga Canal, Helen Hyde, 1912

The major distribution of seafood products has been centered in Mexico City for many years, first at the La Viga Market in the borough of Iztacalco and now at the La Nueva Viga Market in Iztapalapa. The reason the main seafood market is in the capital, rather than in a coastal city, is that Mexico City has a long history of being the economic center of the country. Since pre Hispanic times, much of the seafood and other produce either ended up or passed through here. The people of the Mexico City area have also become accustomed to enjoying the bounty provided by almost all of the states, so the demand for seafood is greatest here.

The first La Viga Market was established near the La Viga Canal, which was named after a 19th-century ranch. In the 19th century, this area was filled with drying land, with artificial islands called “chinampas” and canals, including La Viga, which linked Chalco and Xochimilco, which still had their lakes, to the lake port of San Lázaro, near the historic center of Mexico City. The canal and others in the area were drained and filled in very early in the 20th century, with the La Viga Canal becoming the Calzada de La Viga road. Around this new road, industries and neighborhoods emerged. The old La Viga Market still exists and still sells mostly wholesale, but its customers are more local, such as retailers and restaurants in Mexico City.

La Nueva Viga was established in the mid 1990s because the demand for wholesale seafood outstripped the old traditional market’s ability to distribute. It has become one of the most important markets in Latin America, and the second largest seafood market in the world, after Tokyo's Tsukiji fish market . It and the Mercado del Mar in Zapopan, Jalisco control almost all of the seafood distribution in the country.

Both the old traditional market and the new one are under the same management. The former market chairman was in the position for fifteen years. That term has since been shortened and the current chairman, Jorge Toral Peña, has only a three-year term. He plans a change in the retail area to include a gourmet plaza and area permanently dedicated to promoting the health benefits of eating seafood. On Saturdays, the market hosts cooking classes and hosts contests for seafood recipes.

== Description ==
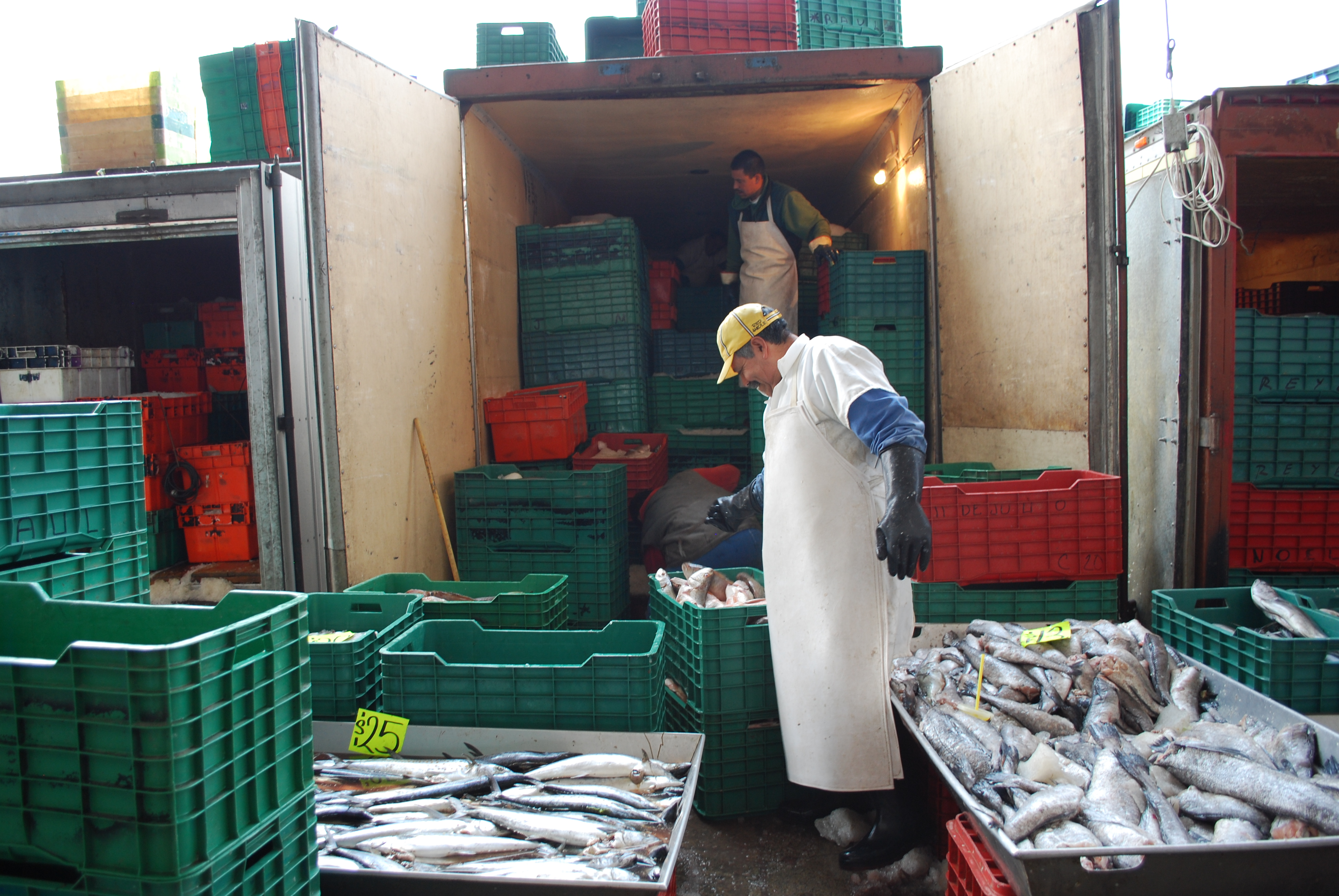
Unloading truck at the market

La Nueva Viga is located on Prologación Eje 6 Sur, Colonia San José Aculco, Iztapalapa . It is located on the property of the government owned Central de Abasto, but this market is privately owned. The facility extends over 9.2 hectares, with 202 wholesale warehouses, 55 retail warehouses and 165 sellers in total. Four warehouses have certified products and another 80 have been ranked as having excellent handling practices, expecting certification.

While by far most of the businesses inside sell fresh and frozen fish, there are other businesses selling kitchen supplies and groceries, and even banks. Outside there is some public transportation and freight services.

The workday starts early, at 4 AM, when trucks loaded with fresh seafood arrive. Between 20,000 and 25,000 customers pass through the facility on any given day. Many clients are restaurant owners from in and around Mexico City. From 6 AM, when stalls open, to 6 PM, the market is filled with the shouts of merchants attracting customers, as well as the sounds of blades as mountains of fish and other seafood are gutted, chopped and otherwise prepared. The market employs about 7,500 people, many of whom are from coastal areas and are used to the strong odor of fish that permeates the interior.

== Products sold ==
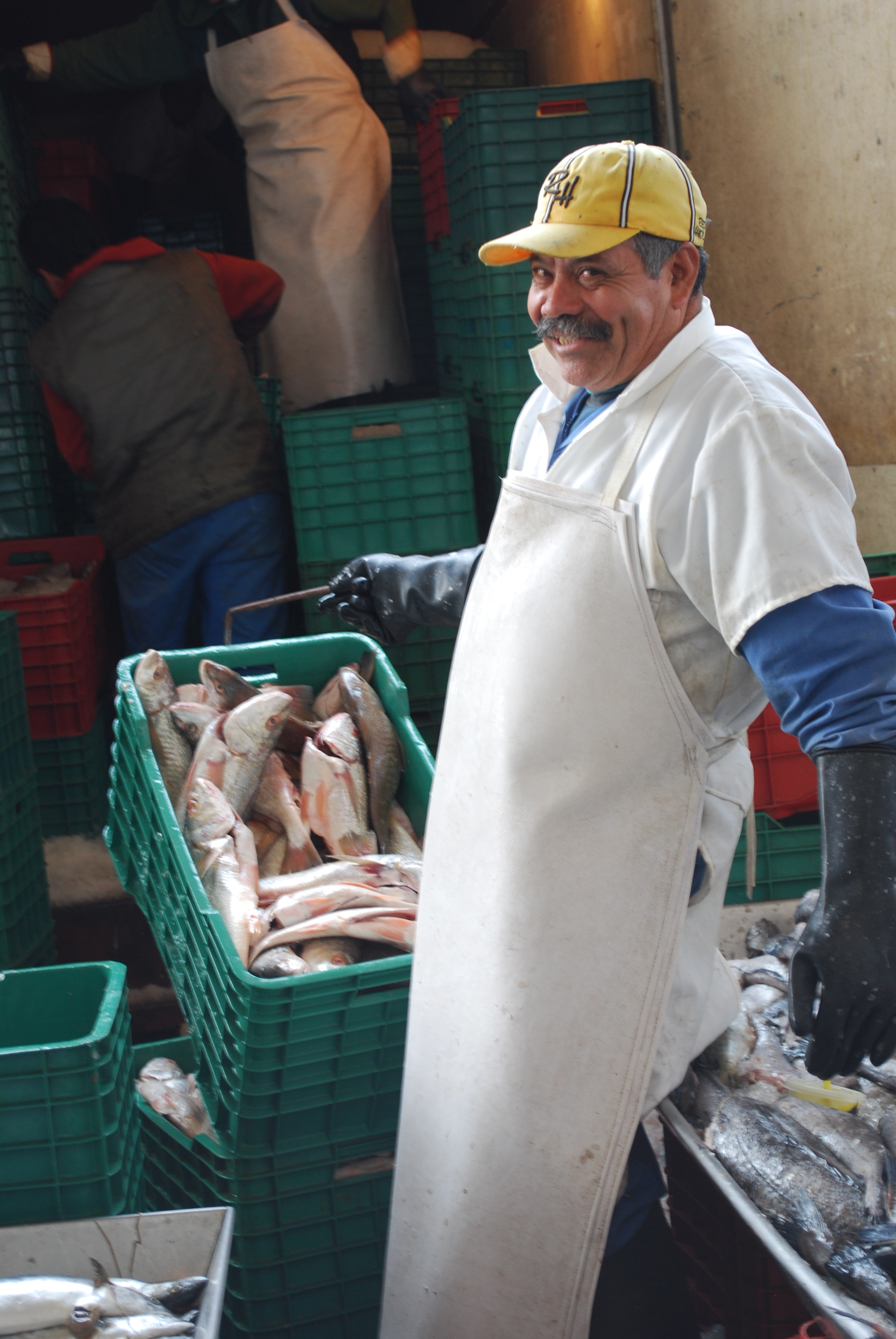
Worker showing off product from truck

La Nueva Viga handles the largest volume of seafood and has the largest assortment of ocean products in Mexico. Approximately 300 different fresh and frozen species and approximately 100 imported frozen species are marketed every day in this supply center. This includes every kind of fish imaginable to shellfish, shrimp, and even sharks and manta rays. An average of 500 tons of fresh fish and 1000 tons of frozen products are handled each day, about sixty percent of the national fishing production, and the second largest volume in the world after the fish market in Tokyo. Most of the seafood is domestic, but imported product can be found from five continents. The seafood comes from all of the coasts of Mexico, but most domestic product comes from the Gulf of Mexico. There is a website dedicated to the inventory of the market, which is updated daily at

Lent is the busiest season for La Nueva Viga and all seafood vendors of Mexico. In 2010, La Nueva Viga sales during this season were 2,500 tons per day. At this time, there are more than one hundred species of fish and shellfish in season, with some selling as low as twelve pesos per kilo. For this important time, federal health officials inspect this and other markets to check for contaminants such as salmonella bacteria and various parasites, in order to reassure the public that the supply is safe.

Most of the seafood sold here is sent to other states and exported as well as sold to more local restaurants and retail markets. Seventy percent of the product sold goes to the city and the neighboring states of Hidalgo, Tlaxcala, Puebla, Morelos and State of Mexico. Much of what is exported is the most expensive, such as sea bass, shrimp, and lobster. However, the most economical species are often not sold in Mexico either as they are unknown to most people’s dietary habits. By far, the most popular seafood sold here and in the rest of Mexico is shrimp, followed weakly by mojarra. For popular species of fish, vendors report that little is wasted. Even the heads, which are often chopped off for clients are reused. The meat inside them is taken out and sold as is or formed into croquets. Spines and other bones with scraps are sold for the making of stock. However, an estimated seven tons of product per day consisting of less popular species is wasted because it does not sell in time.

While the locations selling fresh and frozen fish dominate the market, there are a number of other businesses in the facility as well. The market also has a large number of prepared food stands selling tamales, tacos, cocktails, fillets and other seafood dishes. There are also business selling knives, copper cookware, other kitchen utensils, groceries, banks and government offices.

== Challenges ==
One major challenge to the market is the decline in sales of domestically produced seafood. These have fallen as much as forty percent by some estimates. Vendors at the market claim that some is due to competition from foreign seafood, but most is due to the lack of promotion of seafood by federal government officials, even the Comité Nacional de Fomento al Consumo de Producto Pesquero, which is tasked to do just that. The complaint is that this committee only promotes seafood during the Lent. Due to free trade agreements, seafood from countries such as China, Panama and Chile are appearing at the market and now account for about 10 percent of the sales. Domestic seafood is generally better quality as it spends less or no time frozen, but the frozen imported product is often cheaper. Common imported species include tilapia, shark, sparidae or porgies and carp .

Another problem is that although the market is only fifteen or so years old, the facility has experienced severe deterioration in that short time. One of the major problems is insufficient drainage, leading to bacterial build up and causing the interior to smell very strongly. However, there are also serious problems with the facility’s ceilings and floors as well. Renovation costs are estimated at 100 million pesos. As the market is a private operation, separate from the government, Mexico City authorities state that they cannot provide the financing needed for renovations, but are working with private sources to find alternatives.

The market faces competition with a planned market in Baja California, which accounts for 75% of the seafood produced in Mexico. One reason this market is planned is because of the sanitation problems at La Viga.

One last problem is that there is a lack of public transportation to the facility, making it difficult for many retail buyers to shop here.

== See also ==
Traditional fixed markets in Mexico
