= Traditional markets in Mexico =

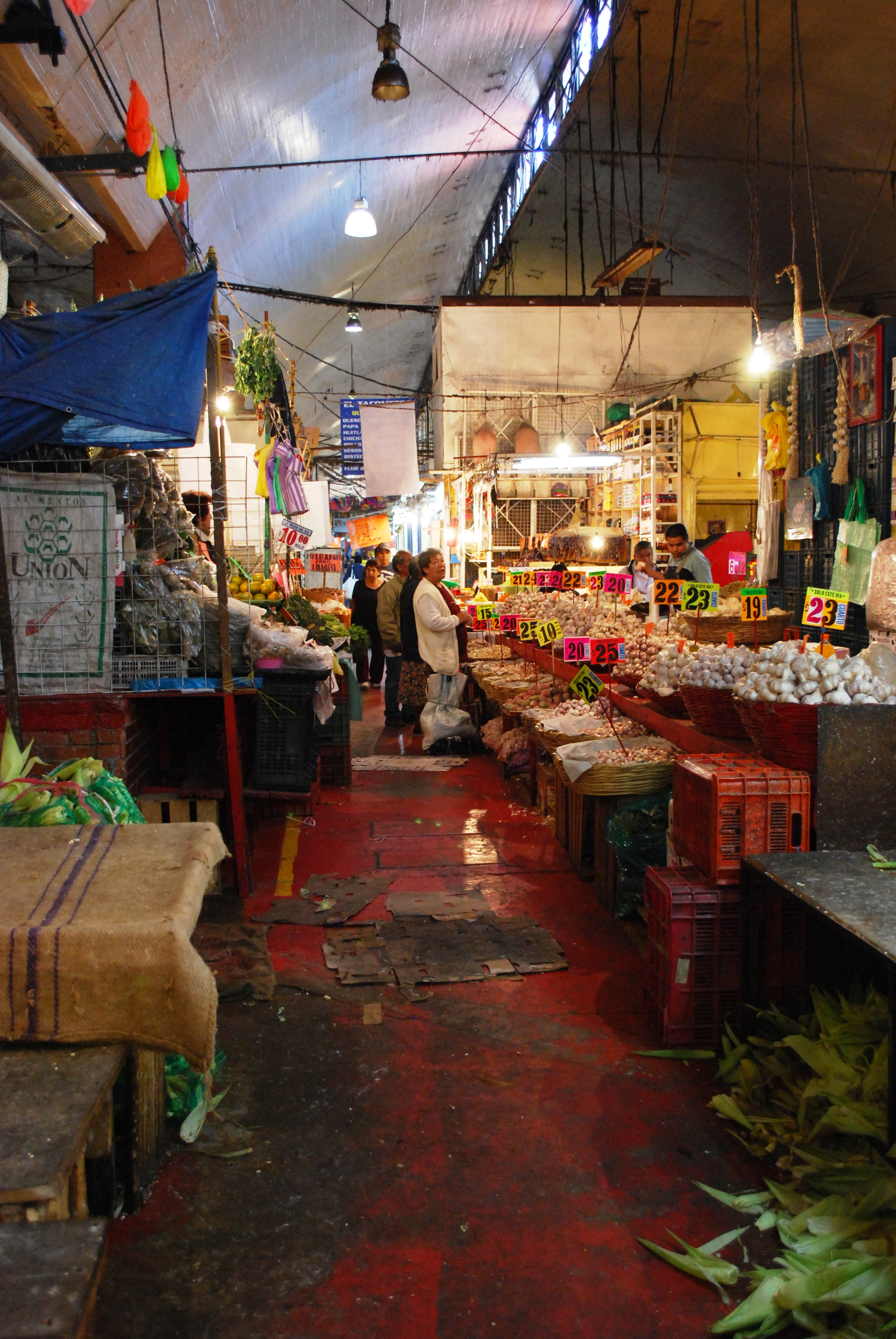
One of the aisles in the La Merced Market in Mexico City

Traditional fixed markets in Mexico are multiple-vendor markets permanently housed in a fixed location. They go by a variety of names such as "mercados públicos" (public markets), "mercados municipales" (municipal markets) or even more often simply "mercados" (markets). These markets are distinct from others in that they are almost always housed in buildings owned and operated by the local government, with numerous stands inside rented by individual merchants, who usually sell produce and other basic food staples. This market developed in Mexico as a way to regulate pre-Hispanic markets called tianguis. These tianguis markets remain in Mexico, with the most traditional held on certain days, put up and taken down the same day, much the way it was done in Mesoamerica.

The fixed mercados can be found in any town of any size in Mexico. Often, they are accompanied one or more days per week by tianguis, which set up around the main building. However, the largest, best developed and most numerous fixed markets are in Mexico City, which has over 300, 80 of which are specialty markets dedicated to one or more classes of merchandise, such as gourmet food, plants, cut flowers, candy etc.

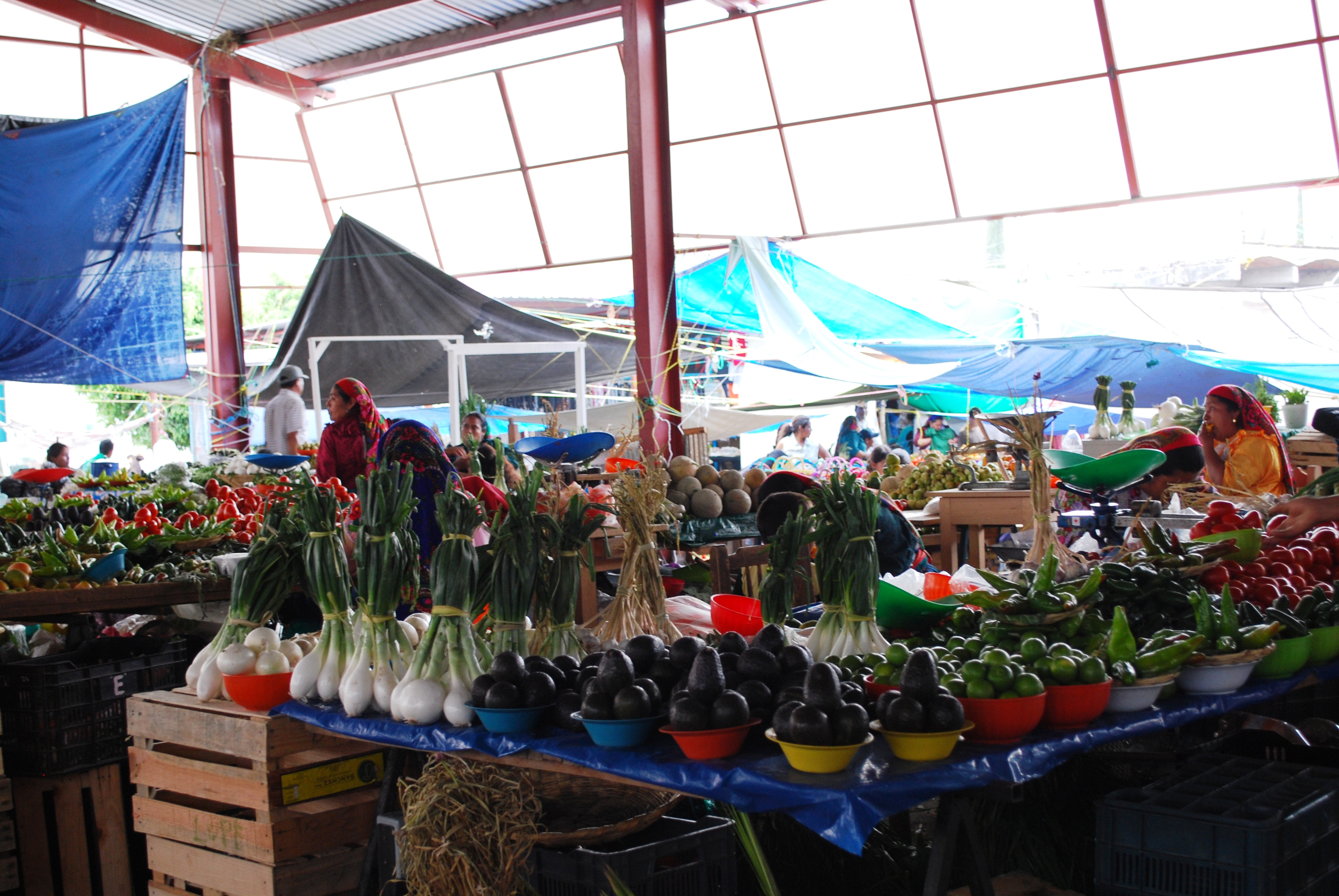
Municipal Market in Tlacolula, Oaxaca

== Traditional fixed markets and tianguis ==
"Lo recorrí por años enteros, de mercado a mercado, porque México está en los mercados". (I went from market to market for years, because Mexico is in its markets.) - Pablo Neruda In every city, town or village in Mexico, there is a traditional market designed to meet basic needs. These can be called by different names. In municipal seats, the main market for the area is called the municipal market. In many areas of Mexico City, "mercados". Most reflect the area's culture and folklore and some are works of art. The municipal president of Tuxtla Gutiérrez, Yassir Vázquez was quoted saying that "Public markets are a live example of our culture" during a meeting of market merchants in the Chiapas capital. The meeting was part of efforts to improve and expand the system of these markets statewide.

These traditional markets are a variation of tianguis, or open air markets, which have been an important part of commerce since pre Hispanic times. The difference is that traditional tianguis are held on specific days, with individual vendors setting up and taking down their stalls on the same day. Like tianguis, traditional fixed markets have stands occupied by various individual merchants, and tend to sell the same kinds of products: produce, groceries and other basic necessities. The difference is that the fixed markets operate every day, and individual stands are rented and occupied in much the same way as a store is. The fixed market has its origin in various attempts to replace tianguis with markets that can be better regulated. However, the tianguis were never replaced. Many tianguis, especially in rural areas, now operate in conjunction with the fixed markets to expand on variety of merchandise available.

In addition to their permanent nature, another important aspect of mercados is that the maintenance and operating costs of the buildings are subsidized by or paid for by the government. Rent, when it is charged, is nominal. Around seventy five percent of these markets are located in middle and lower income neighborhoods. Twenty three percent are located in upper income neighborhoods and two percent in areas considered extremely poor.

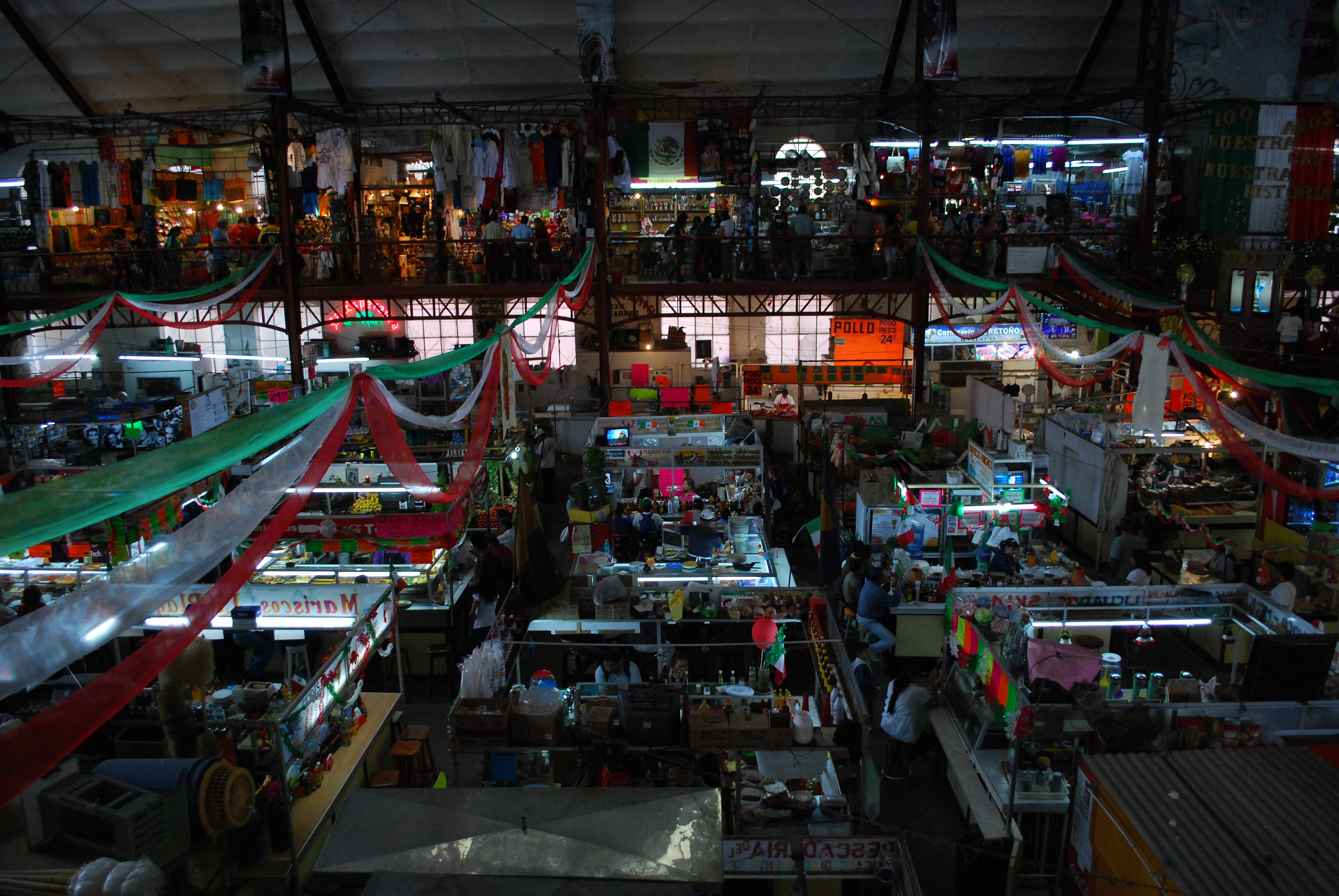
Overview of stands in the Hidalgo Market in the city of Guanajuato.

The most complete anthropological study of how a Mexican fixed market operates was done by Bronislaw Malinowsky and Julio de la Fuente in the 1930s in the city of Oaxaca. The study focused on how the central market of the city worked with the rural communities of the surrounding area. It determined that, for the most part, the relationship had not changed much since before the Conquest in both its economic and social structure. In many areas, local markets, with the abundance of colors, odors, flavors and meanings, represent a synthesis of culture and history of a region, especially that related to commerce that community has with others, according to Amalia Attolina, ethnohistorian at the INAH. In many areas of the country, these traditional markets still constitute a meeting area and a form of social cohesion. Another indication of the market's cultural continuity is the presence of shrines in almost all traditional markets. In Aztec times, these were to deities such as those related to commerce. Today, most are dedicated to the Virgin Mary or Christ.

Mexico City has the most markets for its size but traditional markets are an important part of economy in most of the country. The State of Mexico has 652 such markets, 64.8% of which are in the eastern half of the state. This traditional form of commerce provides 65% of residents' foodstuffs even though other types of stores such as supermarkets have been growing. The city of Toluca has various markets including 16 de Septiembre, Miguel Hidalgo and Jose María Morelos y Pavón and the largest, the Central de Abasto wholesale food market, the second largest in the country after its equal in Mexico City.

Mexico City has the greatest number and variety of both tianguis and fixed markets. and important in the supply chain of basic foodstuffs. The city has 317 public markets with 70,000 vendors, and more than 1,000 tianguis along with 314 self-service stores such as supermarkets. The traditional fixed market model has been expanded to the food distribution at the wholesale level, with the Central de Abastos and La Nueva Viga seafood markets handing foodstuff with an approximate value of 90 billion pesos each year.

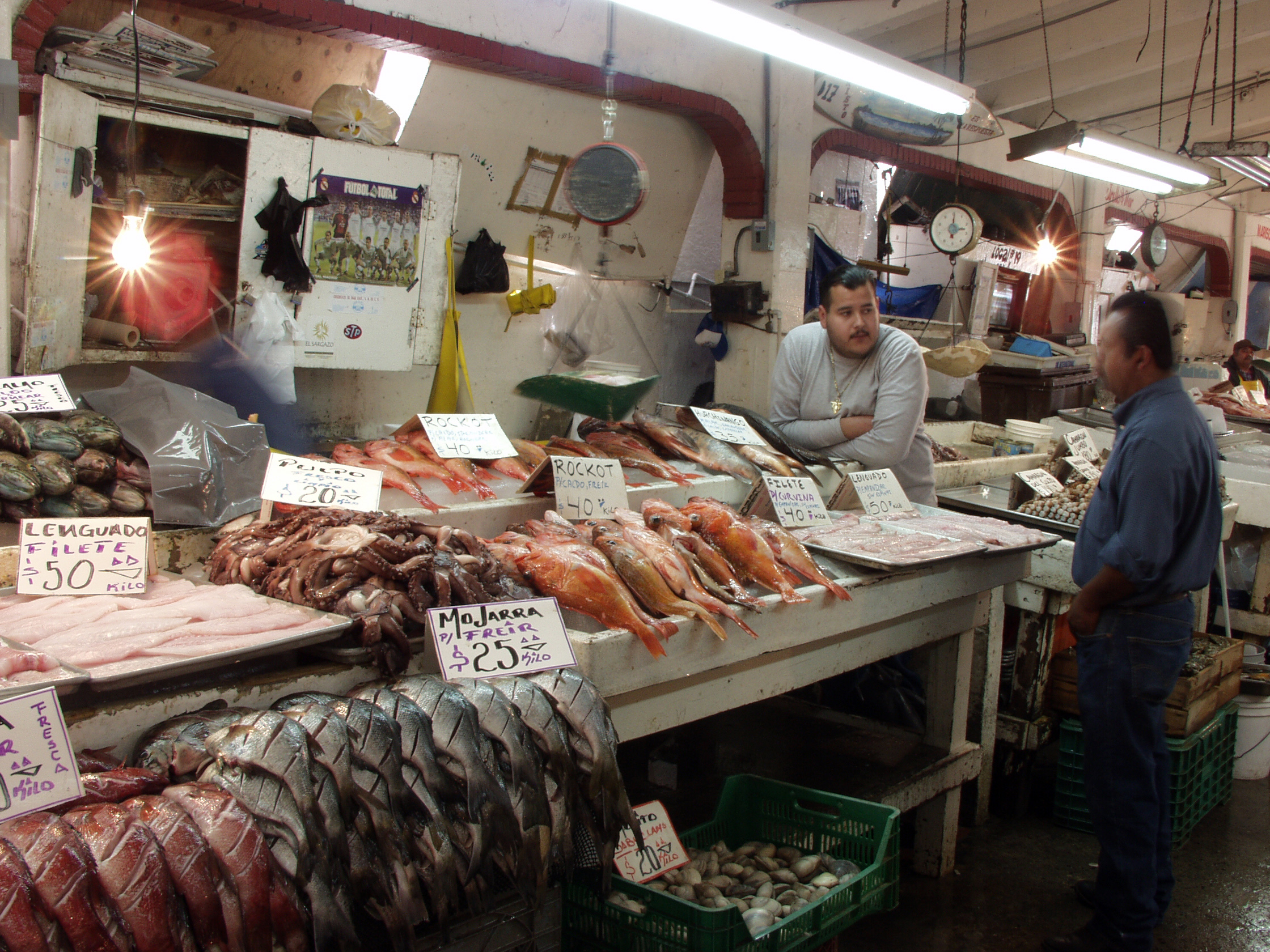
Fish market in Ensenada, Baja California.

The traditional markets have been under pressure since the 20th century by newer forms of retailing, such as supermarkets, chain stores and convenience stores. This is especially true in urban areas, with about eighty percent of all food sales in Mexico City now done in supermarkets and similar outlets. Traditional fixed markets remain most viable in small rural towns, where the social network is strongest and options are limited. The system of a fixed public or municipal market along with a weekly tianguis, is an important part of the economy and food distribution of rural areas. These are how most people in rural areas buy, sell, and sometimes trade to obtain necessities. However, the traditional markets still remain in many of the country's largest cities. One factor in favor of these markets is that the difficulty of getting around by car in the city, increases demand for outlets close to home.

Wholesale markets such as the Central de Abastos are most often the source of the products sold in other forms of commerce, such as corner stores. While supermarkets are considered modern and more sanitary, the traditional fixed market still offers better prices. In 2007 and 2008, sales in traditional markets and tianguis rose between 40 and 44 percent, with sales in lower socioeconomic areas rising between 50 and 53 percent. The most likely reason for this is the economic downturn, which forced families to economize.

However, these traditional markets, especially in major cities, face serious problems. In the past thirty years, there has been no new construction of this type of market in Mexico City, and existing ones have fallen into disrepair. While most of these older markets have had upgrades in gas, electric and drainage, as well as fire extinguishers installed, sixty percent are in danger of fire due to faulty electrical wiring. Many have insect and rodent infestations. Many of these markets are in unsafe areas, with drug addicts, alcoholics, and delinquents.

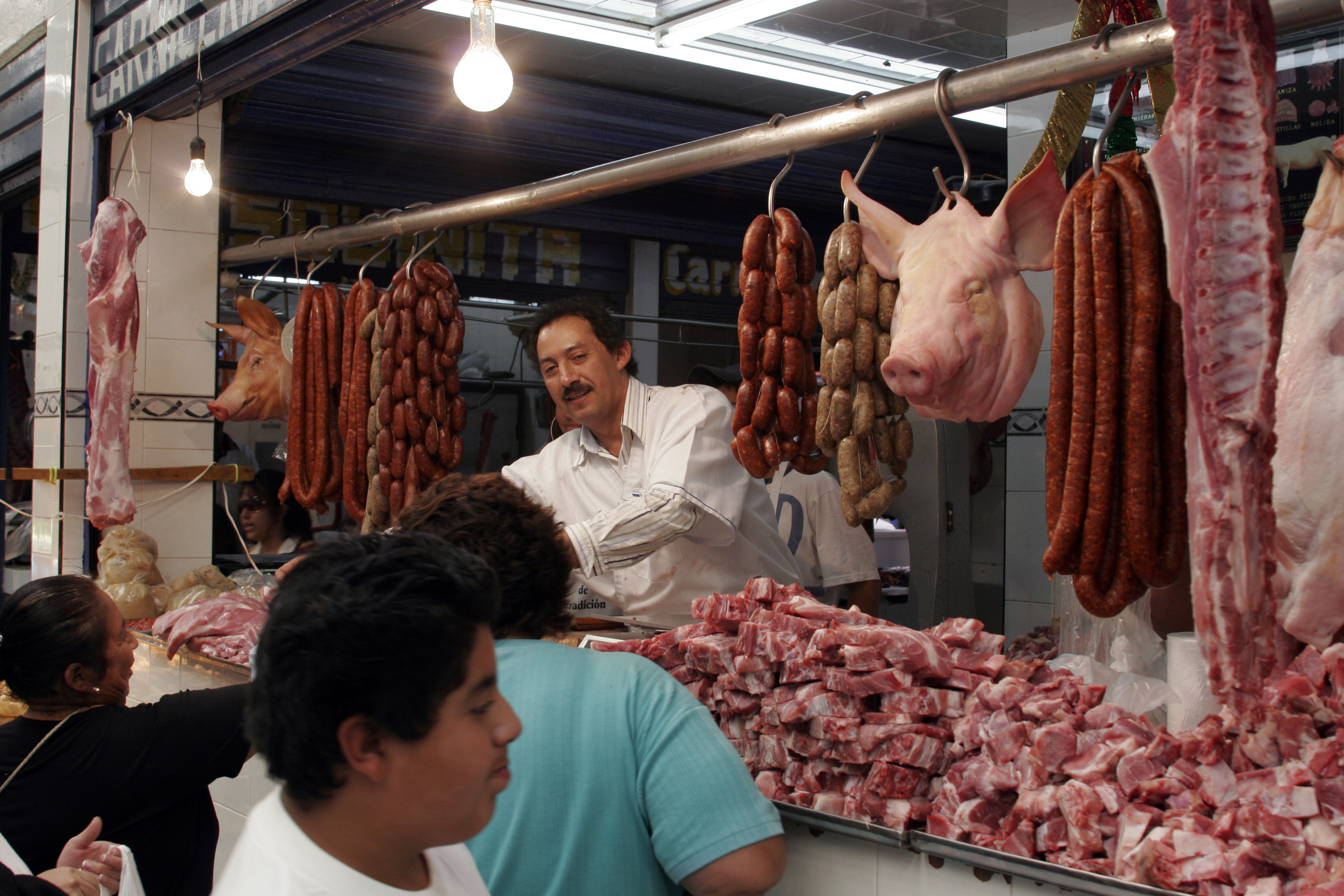
Meat vendor at a market in Tenancingo, State of Mexico.

The operation of these markets has also declined. In Mexico City, about 65% of permits that merchants have to operate in these public markets have some sort of irregularity. None of these markets have adequate sanitary measures for meat. Meat and dairy products sold in tianguis and fixed markets are not regulated or inspected according to the Centro Universitario de Ciencias Exactas e Ingenierías (CUCEI). Contaminants such as Salmonella and E. coli have been detected in products tested by this organization. Since 1997, Mexico City authorities have not carried out inspection in businesses selling groceries of any type in the city. Federal authorities only have jurisdiction in the states.

Since the traditional fixed markets are filled with individual vendors, there are some disadvantages. One main disadvantage of the markets is that it is filled with small vendors, who cannot purchase in bulk like supermarkets. Another, is the inability to pay with anything other than cash. Not only are most vendors not able to take debit or credit cards, they also cannot receive a type of tax exempt food coupon called vales, which many workers receive with their regular salary. However, the Mexico City government in 2010 authorized their employees to use their "vales" at fixed public markets as a move to support this traditional retail outlet.

Traditional fixed markets in the city have been steadily losing their client base. One reason for this is that many have moved out of inner cities where these markets are into the suburbs. Over fifty percent of those who do shop at these markets are over the age of thirty five, with younger and more affluent shoppers preferring supermarkets, which are generally cleaner and better maintained. Markets that have had supermarkets or other chain stores open nearby have seen sales drop as much as fifty percent. This has led to the abandonment of many fixed market stalls and about twenty percent of these markets in the Mexico City area have been abandoned altogether. Although still important, the percentage of foodstuffs sold through basic markets has declined to only about twenty percent in Mexico City. Of the 317 markets, 248 offer fresh produce. Many stands have been replaced by those selling prepared foods such as tortas, juices, unlicensed movies and music, and other items.

Similar problems with empty stalls and lack of maintenance can be found in fixed markets from the north, such as in city of Durango where eighty percent of stands are empty and in the south, such as in Mérida, Yucatán where number have been completely abandoned, and for much the same reason, competition from self-service stores and convenience stores.

== Major markets in Mexico ==
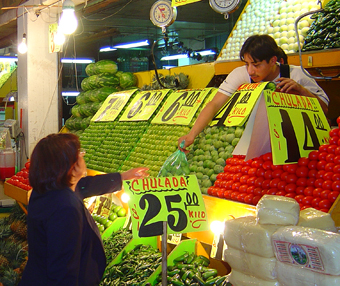
Produce at the Central de Abasto in Mexico City

These traditional fixed market, whether they are called mercados públicos, mercados municipales or simply mercados, operate essentially the same in the entire country. However, Mexico City has the greatest number and variety of both tianguis and fixed markets. The city has 312 traditional fixed markets with cover an areas of about 60,000 m2.

The city's largest general retail traditional market is La Merced, located just east of the historic center of Mexico City. It was a tianguis for many years, before the federal government decided to build a permanent structure for it in the 19th century. By the mid twentieth century, it was the main wholesale market for the city. However, this market became too small to handle the wholesale volume for the growing city. The wholesale function was then moved to the Central de Abastos in Iztapalapa in 1982. However, La Merced remains the largest and one of the busiest in the city.

The largest market in Mexico City is the Central de Abastos wholesale food market, which is located alongside the La Nueva Viga wholesale seafood market in the southeast of the city. The complex is located on a property that extends 328 hectares (810 acres), with more than 2,000 businesses that sell principally fruit, vegetables, meat and some processed foods in a main building that covers 85 hectares (210 acres). The Central de Abastos itself commercializes more than 30,000 tons of food products daily, representing 80% of the consumption of the 20 million people in the Mexico City metropolitan area.

The La Nueva Viga seafood market next door alone handles about sixty percent of all that is consumed in the country of Mexico. This market commercializes 1,500 tons per day and was built in the 1990s to replace the older La Viga Market, although the latter still operates. The next largest market is the Mercado del Mar in Zapopan, Jalisco, which commercializes about ten percent of all the seafood sold in Mexico. The governor of the state of Baja California and the Comision Nacional de Acuacutura y Pesca (Conapesca) is working on a project to open a wholesale seafood market in the state to compete with the La Nueva Viga and Mercado del Mar markets. One reason to put such a market here is that the seas around the Baja California peninsula produces about 75% of the country's seafood.

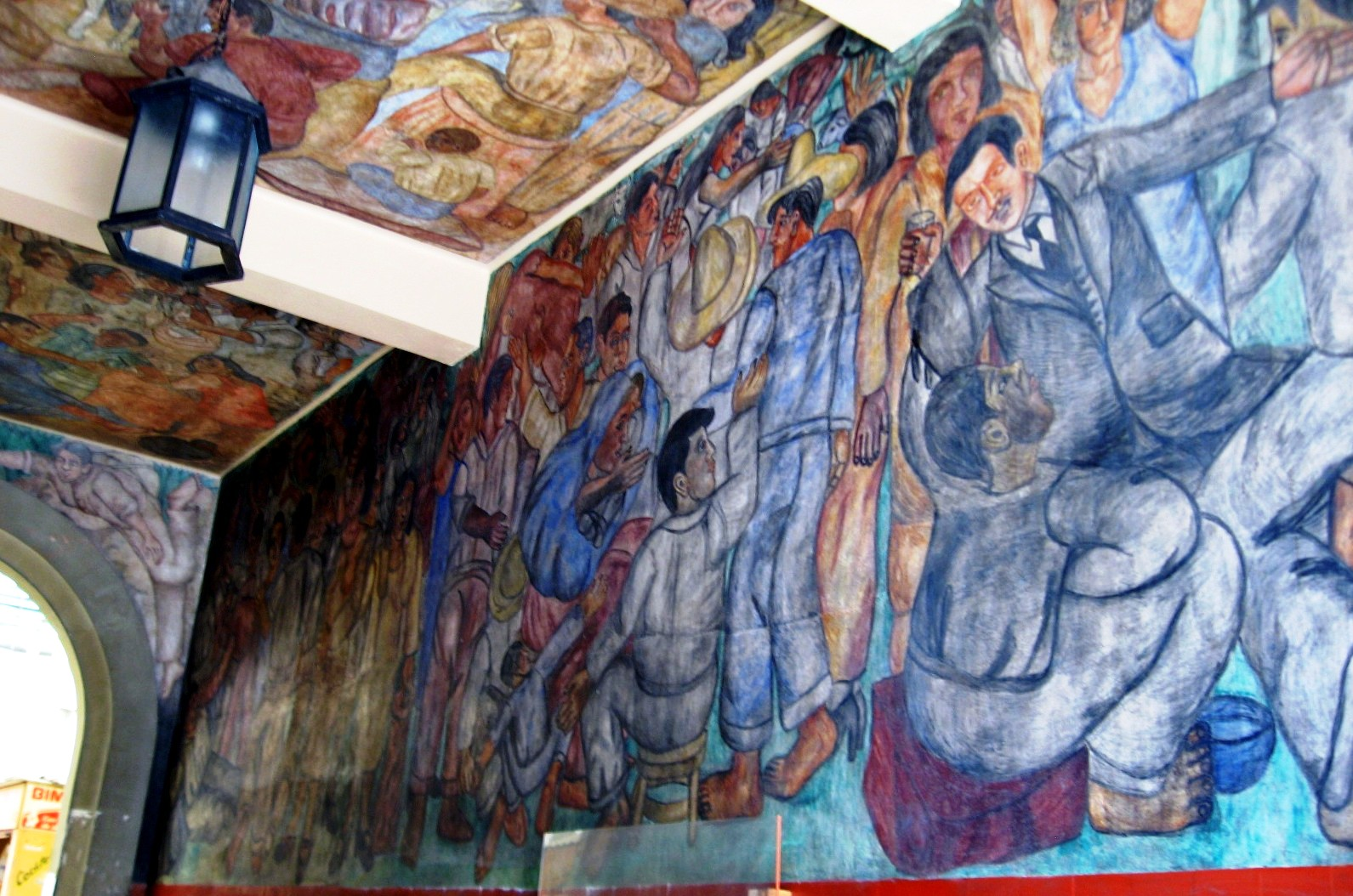
Mural at the Abelardo L. Rodríguez Market

Mexico City has about eighty specialty markets partially or fully dedicated to one or few classes of items. The San Juan Market in the historic center specialized in gourmet foods such as the best produce and expensive and unusual meats and cheeses. Mercado Jamaica was opened in 1957 on chinampa land along Canal de la Viga. It is best known for the sale of cut flowers and ornamental plants with a large section dedicated to produce. Mercado de Sonora sells dishes, live animals and party items, but it is best known for its sections dedicated to herbal medicines and the occult. La Lagunilla has a building dedicated to furniture and another to clothing. This market is also known for its Sunday antiques market. Other specialty markets include one dedicated to candy in Candelaria and an ornamental plant market in the ecological reserve in Xochimilco.

A number of markets are considered historic places. The Abelardo L. Rodriguez Market is located in the historic center of Mexico City, just northeast of the main plaza, or Zocalo. It was built in 1934 as a prototype for a more modern marketplace and has a number of unusual features such as day care and an auditorium. However, the markets most distinctive feature is the approximately 1,450 square meters of wall and ceiling space covered in murals. These murals were painted by students of Diego Rivera and under his supervision. The works mostly reflect socialist themes, such as the exploitation of workers, peasants and miners, the fight against Nazism and fascism, and racial discrimination. Earthquakes, time, humidity and vandalism took their toll on the murals from the time they were painted. Restoration of the murals began in 2009.

Most markets are located in middle and lower income neighborhoods. One exception is the Michoacán Market, located in one of the more prestigious neighborhoods of Mexico City, Colonia Condesa. It is located between Michoacán, Vicente Suárez and Tamaulipas streets where three colonias (official neighborhoods) intersect. It is the only mercado that provides services three, Colonia Condesa, Colonia Hipódromo and Colonia Hipódromo Condesa. These are residential neighborhoods, with some office buildings. They are considered cosmopolitan, with Art Deco and other architecture from the 1930s and 1940s, along with a number of modern structures. It is an upper income neighborhood although it has had problems associated with urban decay. While the market sells foodstuffs retail, most of its sales are to the many restaurants in the area and nearby. La Paz in the center of Tlalpan has been around for about 110 years. It has 161 stands with everything from food to clothes and some esoteric products.

== History of retail markets ==
=== Mesoamerican markets ===
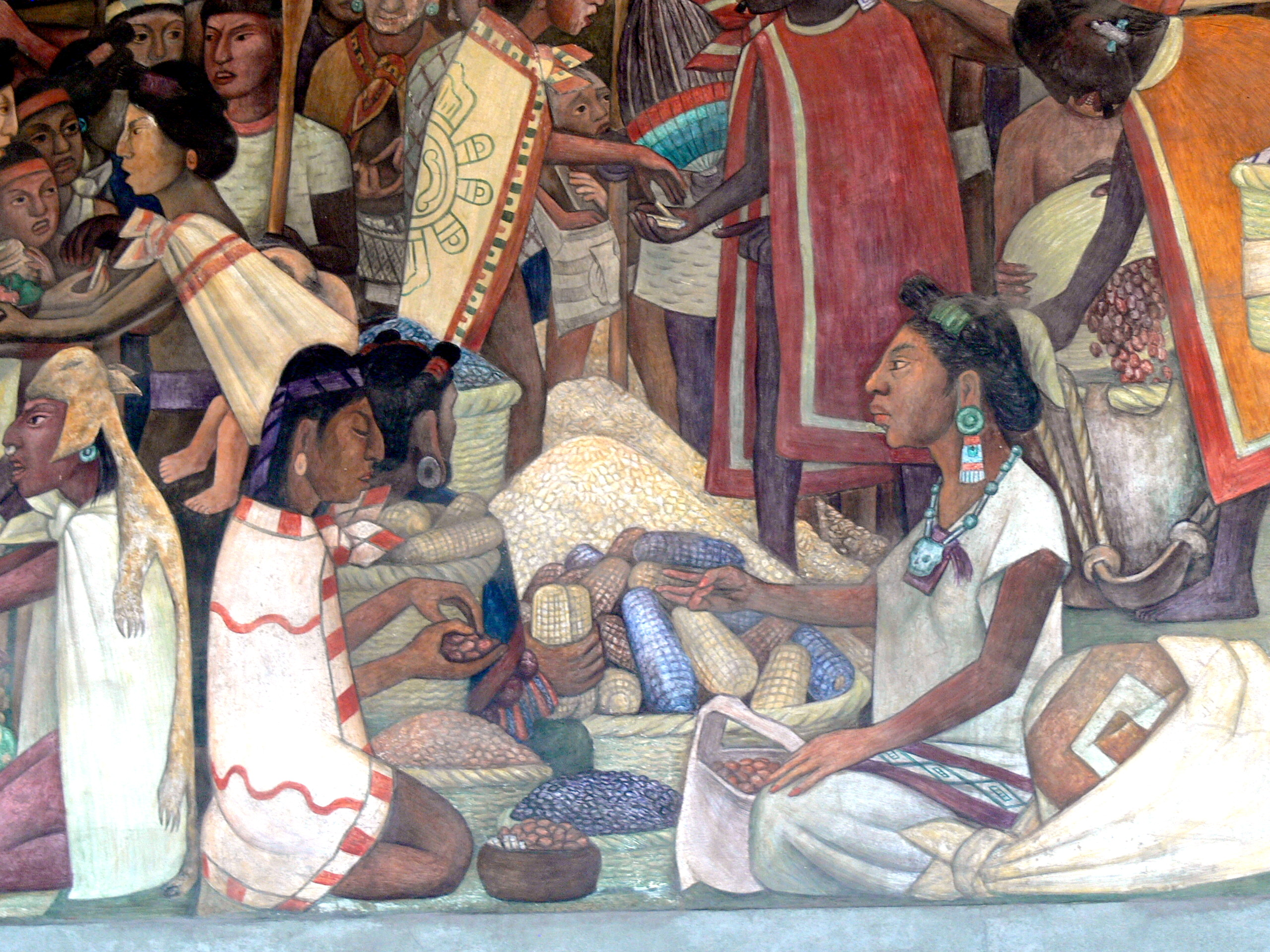
Section of Diego Rivera mural showing a scene at the Tlatelolco market

Mexican traditional fixed markets and a number of other business practices have their origin in pre Hispanic or Mesoamerican trade and markets. Archeological evidence has shown that the Olmecs were probably the first culture with a system of trading networks that spread over what is the center of Mexico. Later cultures with vast trading networks include the Teotihuacans and the Maya. Local products as well as those obtained from trading networks were distributed through local markets called "tianguis" (Nahuatl for "market"), generally set up on certain days. Mesoamerican markets were based on the trading of items, with certain very valuable items such as cacao beans serving as currency. This type of market consists of a number of stands set up by vendors, on a plaza, often designed for that purpose. Often these merchants as well as tradesmen and other business were grouped together by product or service. There were also specialized markets in certain products such as salt in Atenantitlan, dogs in Acolman and slaves in Azcapotzalco and Iztocan.

The most active trading routes were along the Mexican Plateau centered on the Valley of Mexico, whose lakes make transportation of goods easier using boats. The largest Mesoamerican trade network and market system was developed by the Aztecs, who brought valuable goods from distant lands such as jade, cotton, cacao, and precious metals. The main plaza of Tenochtitlan, which roughly corresponds with the Zocalo, was the city's main market at first. This became insufficient and after taking over Tlatelolco, the main market for the area was shifted to there, due to its easy access to lake and canal transportation though La Lagunilla, a small cove. The most important markets were located in Tenochtitlan, Tlatelolco, Azcapotzalco and Tacuba. The largest was Tlatelolco followed by Tenochtitlan, where not only commercial activity took place, but political activity as well. The Tlalteloco market drew between 20,000 and 25,000 people each day to buy and sell. Every five days, was "market day", drawing between 40,000 and 45,000 people as there would be a far greater variety of merchandise. These markets sold everything from basic foodstuffs, to slaves, to exotic items from distant lands to precious metals such as gold.

In the past and the present, traditional Mexican markets reflect the local culture both in what they sell and in how they are sold. Many pre Hispanic elements survive to this day, relatively unchanged. A "tianguis" refers to a market of stalls set up for the day by vendors and taken down at night. More traditional tianguis are periodic, usually weekly, but tianguis in cities may be set up and taken down each day. Small businesses and trades can still be found grouped together in certain areas of cities and markets with specialties, such as Mercado de Sonora, still exist. Pre Hispanic markets has altars inside them for the gods, a practiced continued, but with altars usually to the Virgin Mary or Christ. While these practices are still strongest in former Mesoamerican areas, tianguis and other market practices can be found in various parts of the country.

=== Colonial period and establishment of fixed markets ===
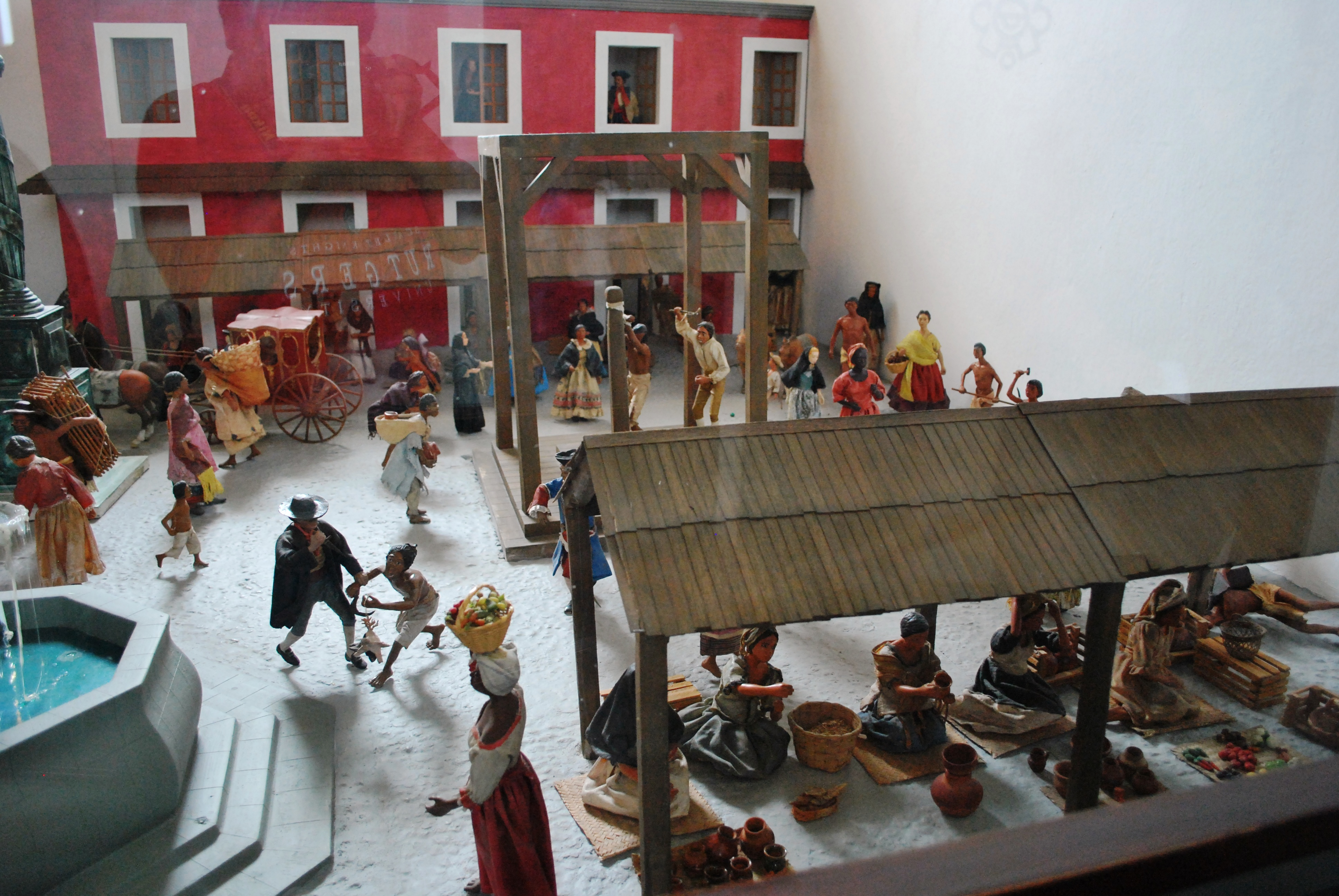
Model of a colonial era market at the Museo Nacional del Virreinato in Tepotzotlán.

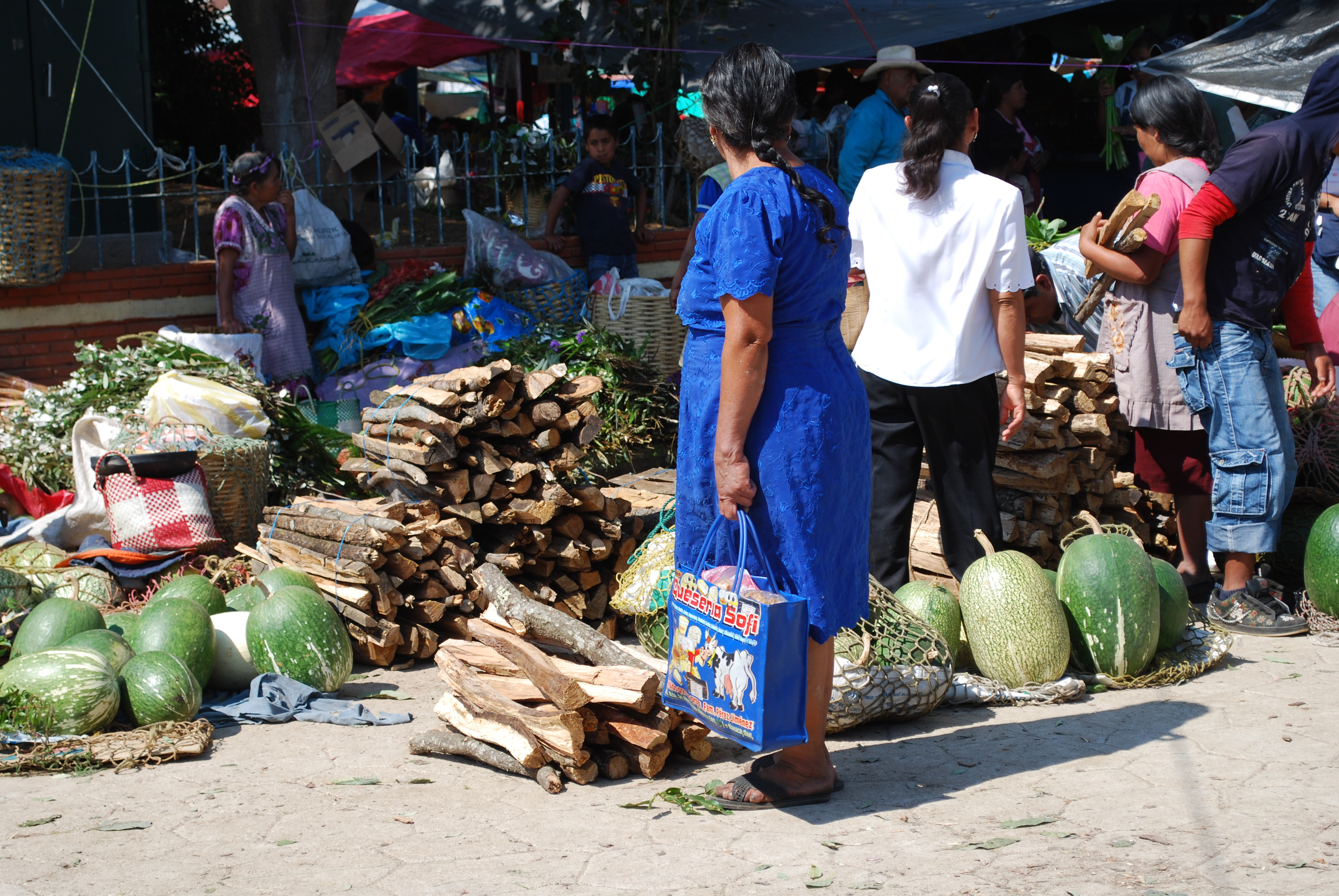
Firewood and other basic needs at the Thursday weekly tianguis next to the municipal market of Villa de Zaachila, Oaxaca

The Spanish conquest of the Aztec Empire mostly did not change commerce patterns in Mesoamerica. Tenochtitlan, renamed Mexico City, remained the center of the economy, with traders bringing merchandise from all the same regions as before. Markets remained outdoor affairs, with individual temporary stalls set up in plazas. Cacao beans would remain as a form of currency until as late as the beginning of the 19th century. Within the Valley of Mexico, the lakes and canals remained the main way of getting goods, especially agricultural products to market in the city and would remain so until their drainage would make them disappear by the end of the 19th century. One exception was that the great Tlatelolco market never recovered from the conquest and disappeared, replaced by the Mercado de San Juan, which was first located in the area where the Palacio de Bellas Artes is now, and then moved to the main square of the rebuilt city, today called the Zocalo.

The main changes brought to commerce by the Spanish initially was the introduction of the wheel, which expanded trade routes and the variety of products regional markets could offer, the introduction of coins and the introduction of crops, animals and other merchandise from Europe. The last made the biggest impact. As early as 1541, indigenous peoples were growing, selling and consuming crops such as radishes, lettuce, pomegranates, peaches, quince, apples and figs. Many craft technologies, such as glazed pottery were also produced and sold; however, the most prized items in colonial markets would be manufactured items from Spain. Another change was the introduction of new agricultural techniques, which diminished the amount of human labor needed. This would create an indigenous and mestizo class of tradesmen in carpentry, pottery, canoe making, locksmithing, ironworkers and much more. As in the markets of old, these new craftsmen would group together into certain sections of town. Carpenters, locksmiths and ironworkers were found on Tacuba Street, sheepskins were prepared and sold in La Palma neighborhood, tanners in San Hipólito and San Sebastián and potters were found on Santa María street. However, not all businesses grouped together. Tailors, bacon makers, shoemakers, bricklayers, bakers and bars selling pulque tended to disperse.

What are now the traditional public retail markets found in Mexico were the result of efforts to regulate and replace tianguis with more modern forms of commerce. The first regulatory step came in 1580, when grain producers were prohibited from selling directly to the market. Instead, they were required to sell to the colonial government, which then stored the grains in large warehouses called pósitos or alhóndigas to sell to the general market.

The establishment of the Zocalo as the main market square meant that commercial development in Mexico would begin here and then spread outward to the rest of the territory. This also meant that the square would be a crowded, chaotic mass of stalls, with various attempts to clear it over the colonial period, with little long-term success. This is because despite all the attempts by civil and religious authorities to control the markets, the indigenous market never disappeared. By the end of the 16th century, a number of indigenous markets were permitted to set up, so that these people could sell their own products, especially in areas then far outside Mexico City such as Tacubaya. Eventually, they began to sell in the main plaza in Mexico City, weekly at first, then daily.

Attempts to regulate the tianguis commerce in the Zocalo led to the establishment of several formal markets. However, these markets would never eliminate tianguis commerce in the plaza. The first formal market was the El Parían in 1703, after a major fire in the city. It was originally established as a common market, with all of the Zocalo's vendors inside. However, the building was not large enough, and the structure's space requirements pushed remaining outside vendors into the areas belonging to the cathedral and government building. This market then became space for the various guilds of the city to market their wares. By the end of the 18th century, it would become the market for the upper Spanish and Criollo classes, selling imported merchandise such as that brought be the Manila Galleon. This was the market's height. After this time, it would slowly decay until it was demolished in 1843.

With the upscaling of the El Parián market, vendors selling to commoners were pushed into two other markets, El Baratillo and El Volador. The El Baratillo was established in 1793, initially with the name of Cruz del Factor. It was on the Zocalo as well, and specialized in handcrafts, secondhand items and food to the lower classes. It was also known for the sale of stolen merchandise as well. Over time, this market would draw thieves and other delinquents and have a reputation for being dangerous. This market would eventually be moved to an area now called Tepito. The first market established off the Zocalo was the El Volador at the end of the 18th century where the Supreme Court of Mexico is now. It was the first market run similarly to traditional retail markets of today, and became the main market for the city after the El Parián and El Baratillo disappeared.

As the colonial period continued, more fixed markets and more regulated tianguis were established outside the Zocalo, including Santa Catarina and La Lagunilla. The Zocalo itself would have several commerce centers. These would include the Portales de Mercaderes, the Portales las Flores and Portales la Diputacion, stores affixed to several of the main buildings surrounding the Zocalo. However, the Zocalo would remain filled with vendors until the 20th century. At the end of the colonial era, markets and tianguis in the city were grouped into three categories. One corresponded to the area in and around the Zocalo. The second most important group of markets was on the periphery of the first group. There were groups of fixed stands made of wood in places such as the plazas of Santa Catarina Mártir, La Cruz del Factor and Las Vizcaínas. The third group consisted on non permanent stands even further away from the center of the city. These included the tianguis of Jesús, La Cal, Santa Ana, Carbonero, Mixcalco and others. During the last century of colonial rule, "estanco" or government monopolies were established on the production and commercialization of certain products, such as tobacco, gunpowder, playing cards, cured hides, salt, mercury and ice (which was brought by mule cart from the Iztaccíhuatl and Popocatépetl volcanos).

Traditional market practices for Mexico were established and best developed in Mexico City. After the Conquest, other areas in Mesoamerica continued their traditional commerce patterns, with Spanish authorities then regulating them and building fixed structures. In areas outside of Mesoamerica, such as Jalisco, there was no major pre Hispanic market system, so that of Mexico City would be transplanted in the new areas. Guadalajara's market history began on the plaza of the Teatro Degollado when the city's general market was established in 1606, following the Mesoamerican tradition of "market day" every five days as a tianguis. After a fire in 1795, covered vending stalls called "portales" were built of adobe and stone for the market. Later a "Parián" market, much like the one in Mexico City was established, with the portales demolished in 1855. Like in Mexico City, the various markets and merchants were often segregated by district, with soap producers in Zacoalco, boot makers in Sayula, chairs and tapestries in Atoyac and cheese in Tizapán. Following Mexico City, merchants adopted the fixed market system to make themselves more visible to the public. Modern markets were built in the city in the late 19th and early 20th centuries including Mercado Corona in 1891, Mercado Libertad or San Juan de Dios in 1896, Mercado Alcalde in 1897, Mercado Mexicaltzingo in 1900 and Mercado Sebastián Allende in 1905. Some others were built later, such as Mercado Zalatitlan in 1920 and Mercado IV Centenario in 1941. However, this city would abandon the traditional market model fairly early in favor of supermarkets and chain stores. New such markets were not constructed again until the 1960s, and then only in new neighborhoods created by the growth of the metropolitan area.

=== Independence to the present ===
After the end of the Mexican War of Independence in 1821, the markets initially had momentum as restrictions against imports were lifted and other measures to free the market had a positive effect. However, for much of the 19th century, the country's political instability would hamper market development and food distribution, with most remaining sold in small tianguis with large, formal markets only in the largest cities. The economic situation began to stabilize in the latter 19th century, especially the last decades under the Porfirio Díaz regime. This government took steps to begin to regulate and modernize the food distribution system by establishing official monopolies called tendajones or estanquillos.

In 1844, a new building was constructed for the El Volador market. The market would be destroyed and terminated by fire in 1870. A number of major markets in Mexico City were either established or formalized during this time. In 1850, the new Mercado de San Juan, also called Iturbide, was inaugurated. The first permanent structure now known as La Merced was constructed between 1861 and 1880. This structure was built to house much of the commercial activity in the area, as well as absorb the vendors of El Volador, which had closed. At this time, the area was still along a major canal called La Viga, filled with docks to receive incoming merchandise to the city from Xochimilco, Chalco and Texcoco. By 1887, there were nine main markets in the capital. In the north, there were the Santa Catarina, Santa Ana and Guerrero markets; in the south, the Mercado de San Juan; in the east La Merced and San Lucas and in the west Dos de Abril and San Cosme. By the end of the century, these were joined by the La Lagunilla market in 1893, the Loreto Market in 1889, and Martínez de la Torre in 1895. At this time as well, more modern forms of commerce would begin to appear in Mexico, such as the establishment of department stores, led by Liverpool and Palacio de Hierro, which still exist.

Mercado Juárez was opened in 1912, the last major market to open before the Mexican Revolution brought market development to a halt. The war disrupted food production and distribution with the abandonment of haciendas, lack of manpower in the agricultural sector and the disruption of transportation systems. With the exception of the Abelardo L. Rodríguez market in 1934, there were no new markets constructed in Mexico City, other than small ones for newly established neighborhoods in the growing city. Outside of Mexico City, formal markets were still be introduced to replace older tianguis. The installation of fixed structures to replace tianguis did not always go well. In Xalapa, Veracruz a new, modern and at the time, spacious market was built and promoted in the 1940s to replace the weekly market at the Plazuela del Carbón. However, at first no one would go and shop there, making it a distinct failure. It took fifteen years of efforts to make the market accepted and profitable.

In the 1950s, the government began to replace a number of markets, which were stalls made of wood and lamínate, with modern buildings. During the presidency of Adolfo López Mateos (1958-1964) eighty eight markets were constructed in Mexico City. Mercados sobre ruedas (markets on wheels) was a concept implemented in 1969, to give agricultural producers a means to sell directly to consumers. The idea was that an association of producers could seek permission to sell their produce in a particular spot on a particular day of the week. However, many of these associations became dominated by intermediaries rather than by the farmers themselves, as the producers could not spend many days selling their merchandise. Today, "mercados sobre ruedas" is used to refer to informal street vendors who sell in large groups but generally can be found every day in the same location, rather than on market days, such as tianguis. According to INEGI, about 23 percent of the population earns money in the informal economy, with includes the mercados sobre ruedas and tianguis.

During the rest of the 20th century, commercialization patterns for food and other staples were strongly influenced by the United States, with the introduction of concepts such as supermarkets and convenience stores. The current retail situation in Mexican cities varies widely. On one end, there are a myriad of small corner stores (called misceláneas, expendios de abarrotes or tienditas) and on the other are major supermarket and department chains such as Comercial Mexicana, Walmart, Liverpool and others. These types of markets now account for eighty percent of food sales in Mexico City. The appearance of supermarkets has diminished the sales in many markets. For example, sales at the market in Colonia Industrial were cut by half when a supermarket opened nearby in 2009. Although mercados usually have better prices and fresher produce, the rundown conditions of many is one factor why many consumers prefer supermarkets.
