= Mercado de Sonora =

Market in the historic center of Mexico City

Coordinates: 19°25′19.95″N 99°7′28.86″W

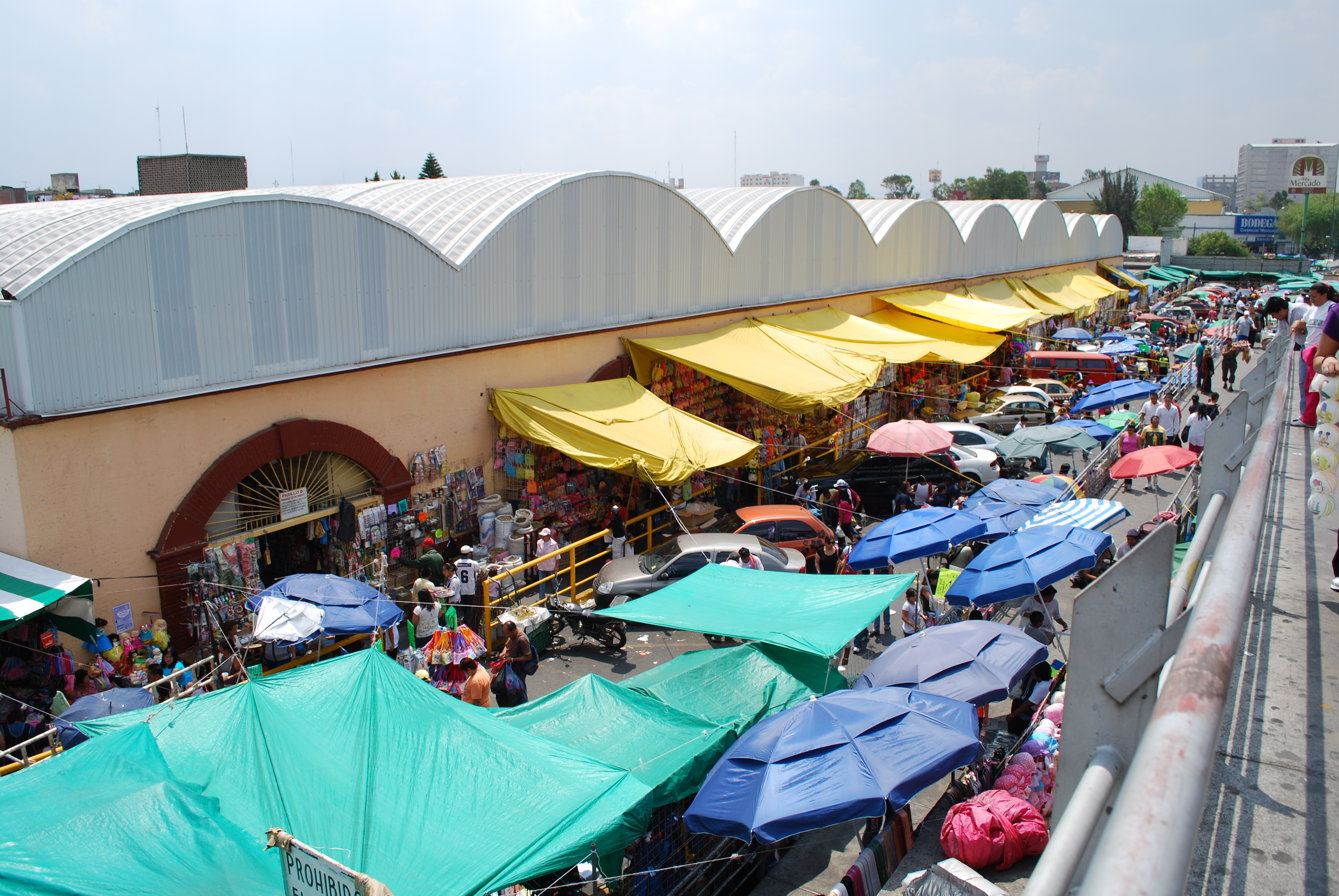
Mercado de Sonora on a Saturday morning

Mercado de Sonora (Sonora Market) is a city-established traditional market, located just southeast of the historic center of Mexico City in the Colonia Merced Balbuena neighborhood. It was established in the 1950s with a number of other similar institutions in order to help regulate retail commerce in the city. This market has specialized in a variety of merchandise such as pottery, party items, and live animals — and the two which make it notable, herbal medicine and items related to magic and the occult.

== Establishment ==
Mercado de Sonora was one of a number of mercados públicos or public markets established by the city government on September 23rd 1957, along with others such as Mercado Jamaica and the La Merced market. It is part of a number of mercados públicos or public markets established by the government to better organize and regulate retail commerce. It is derived from the pre-Hispanic tianguis or street market tradition, which still continues. It was originally set up with a large parking area for cars, but over time this space dwindled as the market grew. The official opening of the market was in 1957. For the market's 50th anniversary in 2007, there was a large party with actress Edith González as special guest. The event also included mariachis and a limpia or cleansing to rid the establishment of any negative energy.

== The facility ==
The market is located in the Colonia Merced Balbuena neighborhood of the Venustiano Carranza borough. This site is traditionally commercial, located near an old fire station. The area used to contain exclusively narrow, haphazard streets, but around the same time as the market, a number of main thoroughfares (called ejes) were built and now surround most of the complex. However, the areas behind the market still contain the old, narrow streets.

The building consists of a single large nave mostly constructed of metal. Inside, there are a number of narrow aisles containing stalls owned or rented by individual merchants. Most merchants are grouped by the type of merchandise they sell, such as party supplies, dishes, and pets. What little parking lot is left is filled by street vendors. On Saturday, when the market is busiest, these vendors overflow from the parking lot onto the surrounding narrow streets. These and various trucks and other vehicles block traffic, effectively closing the streets. The scene is noisy, filled with shouts of vendors and music blaring from stands selling CDs. However, this is also the time to find the widest variety of merchandise, such as nopal cactus and fresh corn from Milpa Alta, flower pots and soil from Xochimilco, and medicinal herbs from Puebla, Morelos and the State of Mexico.

However, the mass of street peddlers outside and the lack of maintenance of the building proper has deteriorated the condition of the market greatly. The peddlers nearly hide the market proper and promote a lack of security and cleanliness. The building also has not been well maintained since it was built. The lack of maintenance has led to leaky roofs, ramps and floors in very poor condition and problems with hygiene. Market representatives state that these problem are mostly due to corruption of borough authorities, who are also known to extort money from market merchants. There have been attempts to clear the street vendors from the parking areas of the market, with the last sweep occurring in 2002.

== Medicinal herbs and magical items ==
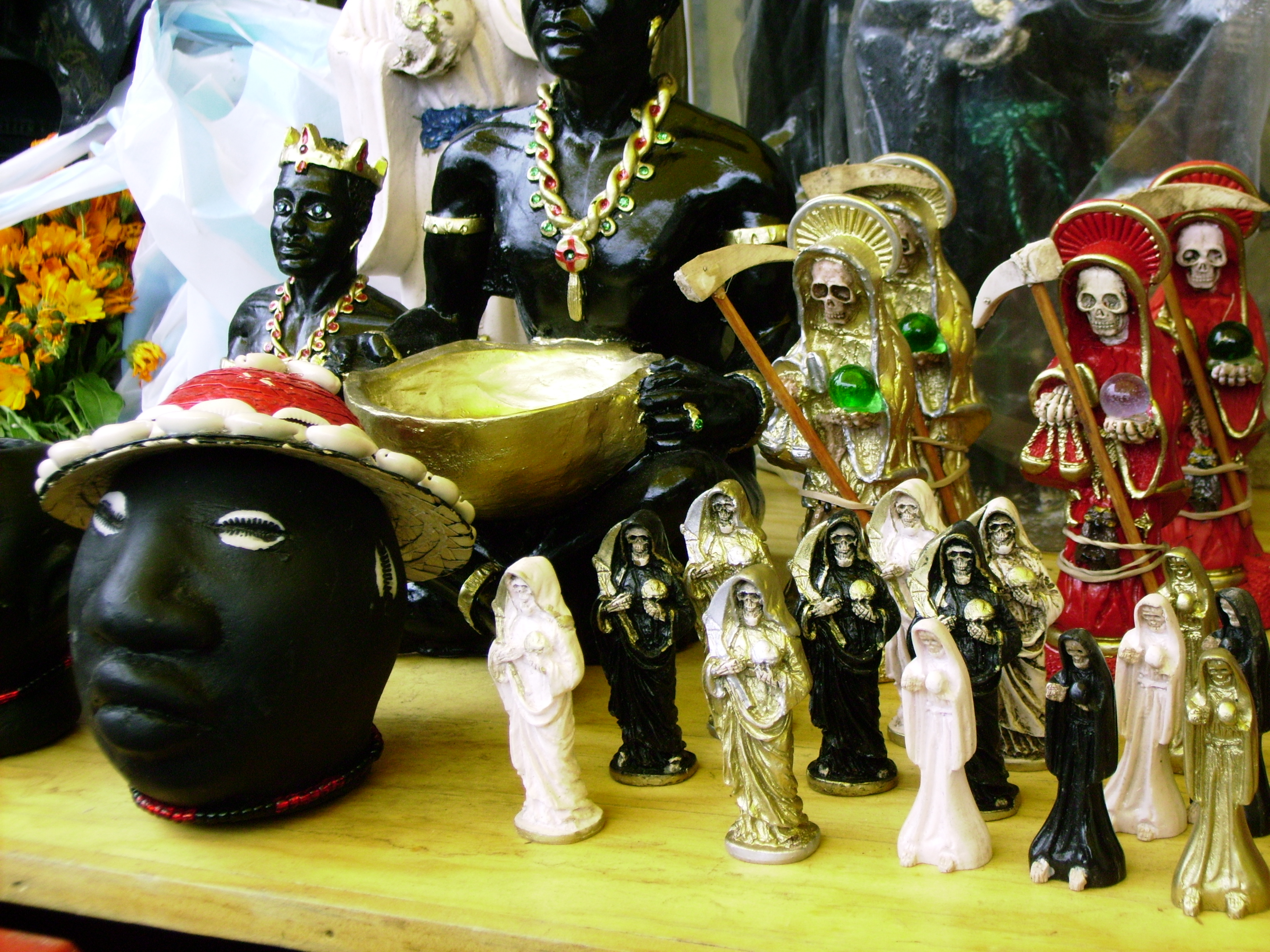
Items related to Santa Muerte and others.

What makes this market different and famous are the aisles dedicated to medicinal plants, magic and the occult, which are only two located in the back of the large nave. This part of the market attracts customers from most socioeconomic levels, as well as tourists. as it is promoted in various guide books. The two types of products, herbal medicines and magical/occult items, are not completely separate, as for centuries traditional Mexican herbal medicine has been strongly linked with religious and magic practices. The variety of medicinal plants sold is vast and include avocado leaves for inflammations, chiranthodendron for the heart, jacaranda flowers for the stomach and more. There is also dried rattlesnake, which is considered a medicine against cancer, dried skunk to “strengthen the blood,” and starfish. Plant items more strongly associated with magic and religion include crosses of ocote wood for good luck, chains of garlic to ward off evil and a seed called "deer's eye" to protect against the “evil eye.”

The market sells occult items related to magic (white and black), pre-Hispanic religious and magical traditions, Santería, the cult of Santa Muerte, shamanism, and various others which demonstrate the syncretism of beliefs and practices that exist in the city. The market is one of the city's centers for practices related to Santería and the worship of Santa Muerte. It is estimated that 2,000 people each weekend come to the market specifically for this section of the market. Items for sale include amulets, horseshoes, candles in a wide variety of sizes, shapes and colors, with many of the colors have very specific functions, gold dust, black salt, powders of unknown ingredients, water of Saint Ignatius-to ward off unwanted attention, aromatic lotions and soaps, many of which are related to love spells and more.

The most popular items are those related to love. There are candles, oils, amulets, soaps, needles, lotions, tobacco, herbs, and services such as spell casting and cleansings all geared to finding, keeping or recovering love. Products have names such as atrapahombres (trap men), ven a mi (come to me), miel de amor (honey of love) and Amansa guapos (tame handsome men). Most are related to ritual use of some kind, even as simple as burning a candle. Others are more complex with a mix of occult and standard religious practice. As late as the 1990s, before medical abortion was legalized in Mexico City, one herbal remedy sought in the market was one to promote the termination of a pregnancy. Those who sold it did not give the treatment, rather they instructed the client what to use and how. The client was responsible for preparing the mixtures and taking them in order to take on the medical and legal risks onto themselves. Medical risks were serious as the treatment always led to excessive hemorrhaging which would require medical attention. During the H1N1 flu scare in 2009, business fell at the market about 50%. However, for herbal medicine sellers, demand for a 10-herb blend designed to prevent and treat the flu kept a number of vendors solvent. The remedy includes eucalyptus, bougainvillea and tejocote fruit, selling for 80 pesos per kilo. During the same time period, merchants selling Santa Muerte paraphernalia reported selling a significant number of white dresses for the images, as the color is associated with health and purity.

== Cartonería, Day of the Dead, Judas and alebrijes ==
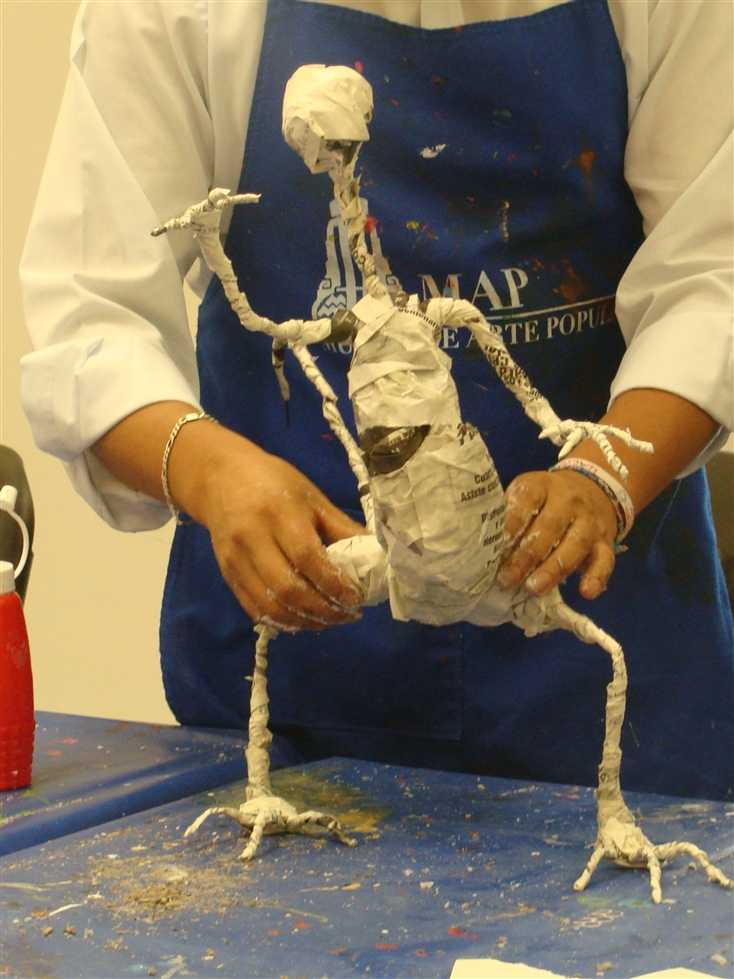
Making an alebrije with paper mache

Mercado de Sonora is one of the traditional markets for purchasing items related to Day of the Dead in Mexico City on 2 November. During this time, the aisles fill with items such as sugar skulls, papel picado (crepe paper cut into designs and hung like flags), representations of skeletons and more. There is Halloween influence as well, with items made to resemble witches, ghosts, Jack-o'-lanterns, etc.

The market and the area around it are also known for the making of large and small paper sculptures called cartonería. This is a tradition that goes back hundreds of years, creating figures and other decoration for use in community festivals. The busiest times for cartonería artists is Day of the Dead, when the demand for decorations, especially skeletons is highest, and Holy Week, when there is demand for the depiction of evil called “Judas” which is burned in effigy. The Judas figures are inspired by the disciple that betrayed Jesus, but traditionally is depicted as a devil. However, other unliked figures can also substituted. These include political figures, especially those who have been involved in a recent corruption scandal.

The best-known of the cartonería artists is the Linares family, which has been creating figures for five generations. For this family, like most others, it began as a seasonal occupation, but in the first half of the 20th century, Pedro Linares conceived of making fantastic monsters of cartonería which he called alebrijes. Over time, these creations became famous, culminating in international acclaim by the 1970s, and are in demand by collectors, galleries and museums. The craft inspired a similar one in Oaxaca, Linares’ home state, made with local wood and generally much smaller, but still fantastic creatures painted in bright patterns and bold designs. In 1990, Linares received the distinguished National Award for Science and Art from the Mexican government. The Linares family continues to make alebrijes and more traditional figures in their workshops located just behind the Mercado de Sonora.

== Other merchandise ==
The other aisles of the market are also dedicated to a number of specialties. Some areas are dedicated to pottery and dishes for everyday use, much of which is from the state of Guanajuato. These include plates, bowls, jars for atole, coffee cups, large platters and more. While traditional pottery still dominates, it is also interspersed with cheaper glass items as well. Another traditional area sells toys and party favors. Traditional wooden, cloth and clay toys can still be found, although they are slowly being replaced with cheaper plastic ones. These include dolls, tops, yo yos, cup-and-ball and many more. This area also carries party supplies such as hats, decorations and piñatas, mostly for children's events. The area also contains costumes for children, such as animals like rabbits and bears as well as princesses and ballerinas. There are also traditional “indito” (little Indian) outfits mostly used in schools on Corpus Christi.

There is also a section that sells live animals, from baby chicks, puppies, kittens, toucans, parrots, hamsters, full grown roosters and hens, ducks, rabbits and various species of snakes. Animals also include exotic species, including some in danger of extinction, which has cause the police to raid the market. Eggs which can be hatched are also for sale for a number of species, including peacock.

== In popular culture ==
The Mercado de Sonora serves as a key setting in the short story El Amarre by Elda Orozco, a supernatural tale exploring obsession and magical manipulation. The plot follows a protagonist who visits the market’s famed "Aisle Eight" (known for its occult vendors) to procure a love spell (amarre), only to confront unintended consequences. The market’s hierberas (herbalists) and a mysterious figure called "The Weaver" feature prominently, with the narrative delving into themes of agency, reciprocity, and the perils of supernatural interference.
