= List of Mexican artisans =

This is a list of notable Mexican artisans:

== Baskets and other non-textile fibers ==
- Feo Ariza (straw mosaics)
- Rosalinda Cauich Ramirez (baskets)
- Ángel Gil (ixtle fiber products, Guanajuato)
- Apolinar Hernandez Balcazar (baskets, State of Mexico)
- Fortunato Hernández Bazán (ixtle fiber products, Oaxaca)
- Fortunato Moreno Reinoso (reed and bamboo objects, Michoacan)
- Pineda Palacios family (palm frond nativity scenes, Puebla)
- María Quiñones Carrillo (baskets, Chihuahua)
- Felipa Tzeek Naal (palm frond weaving, Campeche)
- Villajuana family (hammocks, Yucatán)
- Andrés Uc Dzul (Panama hats, Campeche)

== Lacquer ware ==
- Mario Agustín Gaspar (Michaocan)
- Pablo Dolores Regino (Guerrero))
- Francisco Coronel Navarro (Guerrero)

== Metal working ==
- Apolinar Aguilar Velasco (steel blades, Oaxaca)
- Antonio Pineda (silversmith)
- Punzo family (copper crafts) (Michoacán)
- William Spratling (silver, Guerrero)

== Paper-based crafts ==
- Linares family (alebrijes and cartonería)(Mexico City)
- Pedro Linares (alebrijes and cartonería, Mexico City)
- Rodolfo Villena Hernández (cartonería, Puebla)
- Hermes Arroyo (cartonería and other media, San Miguel de Allende))
- Sotero Lemus
- Adalberto Álvarez Marines

== Pottery ==
- Aguilar family (pottery)
- Josefina Aguilar (Oaxaca)
- Hilario Alejos Madrigal(Michoacan)
- Neftalí Ayungua Suárez (Michoacan)
- Alberto Bautista Gómez (Chiapas)
- Jesús José Berabe Campechano(Jalisco)
- Blanco family(Oaxaca)
- Teodora Blanco Núñez
- María Lilia Calam Que(Campeche)
- Celso Camacho Quiroz (State of Mexico)
- Jesús Carranza Cortés (ceramic figures, Jalisco)
- Alfonso Castillo Orta (Trees of life, Puebla)
- Miguel Chan and Roger Juárez (Yucatán)
- Cayetano Corona Gaspariano(Tlaxcala)
- Margarita Cruz Sipuachi (Chihuahua)
- José García Antonio(Oaxaca)
- Maximo Gómez Ponce(Puebla)
- Adrián Luis González(State of Mexico)
- Gorky González Quiñones(Guanajuato)
- Florentino Jimón Barba(Jalisco)
- Leonarda Estrella Laureano(Sinaloa)
- Carlomagno Pedro Martínez (barro negro, Oaxaca)
- Zenón Martínez García(Jalisco)
- Esther Medina Hernández(Puebla)
- Felipa Hernandez Barragan(Morelos)
- Emilio Molinero Hurtado(Michoacan)
- Rosalinda Cauich Ramirez (Quintana Roo)
- María de Jesús Nolasco Elías(Michoacan)
- Trinidad Núñez Quiñones
- Nicasio Pajarito Gonzalez (Jalisco)
- Ignacio Peralta Soledad (ceramic sculptures, Puebla)
- Juan Quezada Celado(Chihuahua)
- Guillermo Ríos Alcalá(Colima)
- Elena Felipe and Bernadina Rivera(Michoacan)
- Doña Rosa (barro negro, Oaxaca)
- Pedro Ruíz Martínez and Odilia Pineda (Michoacan)
- Ángel Santos Juárez(Jalisco)
- Soteno family of Metepec(State of Mexico)
- Cesar Torres Ramírez (Talvera pottery, Puebla)
- Uriarte Talavera (Talavera ceramics, Puebla)
- Salvador Vázquez Carmona(Jalisco)
- Angélica Delfina Vásquez Cruz (Oaxaca)
- Jorge Wilmot (Jalisco)

== Textiles ==
- Ana Karen Allende (rag dolls, Mexico City)
- Leocadia Cruz Gómez (backstrap loom weaving, Veracruz)
- Celsa María Iuit Moo (henequen weaving, Yucatán)
- Florentina López de Jesús (weaving, Guerrero)
- Pedro Preux (rug making, Mexico City)
- Arnulfo Mendoza
- Original Friends Dolls (cloth dolls, Guadalajara)
- Porfirio Gutierrez (weaver)

== Wood ==
- Jacobo Angeles
- Aguirre family (inlaid wood items, Jalisco)
- Manuel Jiménez Ramírez (alebrijes, Oaxaca)
- Alejandro Rangel Hidalgo (furniture, Colima)
- José Reyes Juárez (masks, Tlaxcala)
- Hipolito Vázquez Sánchez (wood carving, Tlaxcala)
- Ascensión de la Cruz Morales (musical instruments, Durango)
- Agustín Parra Echauri (reproduction of colonial era pieces, Jalisco)
- Agustín Cruz Tinoco (Oaxaca)
- Plácido Otilia family (musical instruments, San Luis Potosí)
