= Esther Hernández =

Esther Hernández may refer to:

- Esther Hernandez (artist), performance and installation artist
- Esther Medina Hernández, Mexican potter

== See also ==
- Ester Hernandez (born 1944), San Francisco-based Chicana visual artist
