= Rosalinda Cauich Ramirez =

Rosalinda Cauich Ramirez (born February 24, 1962) is a Mexican artisan specializing in basket weaving. Her work has been recognized with various awards.

Cauich Ramirez was born in Kopchén, a small community 22 km southwest of Felipe Carrillo Puerto in the southeastern state of Quintana Roo. She received her first basket as a gift when she was seven, but began making them when she was ten. At that time, the municipality brought an instructor to the community to teach fiber arts, and she began making fruit bowls and round baskets with carrying handles. Her father encouraged her interest by collecting materials for her and helping with their preparation.

Today, she has a repertoire of over forty basic designs, which include baskets of various shapes and sizes, animal figures, fruit bowls, carrying bags, cradles, lamp bases, flower vases and more. She principally works with a plant called guaco, a fibrous, resistant climbing vine found in the higher altitudes in the Yucatan Peninsula, originally used by her community to create thatched roofs. There are eleven different species of guaco in Quintana Roo, with the most common called tendón de sapo in Spanish or chiicheních much in Maya. If the vine is tough, she boils it first to take the bark off and divide it into strips. She uses her hands to weave the vines but sometimes uses her feet for stability.

She has passed on her ability to her eight children, her nieces and nephews and her husband, Jacinto Mex Puc. Her family depends on this activity economically, and her children participate in workshop activities among other activities.

The activity has allowed her to travel and meet other artisans in various parts of Mexico, as well as win various recognitions. She has won first place for pieces made for various crafts competitions, such as first place in the semi rigid fibers category at the 2011 Concurso Nacional de Fibras Vegetales organized by FONART. In 1996, she was named a Grand Masters by the Fomento Cultural Banamex, and in 2011 was named a “distinguished woman of Quintana Roo” by Governor Félix González Canto.
