= Francisco Coronel Navarro =

Mexican artisan

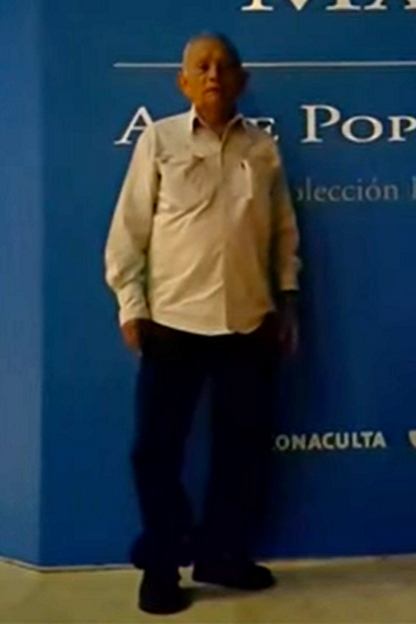
Francisco Coronel on 2016.

Francisco Coronel Navarro (b. 1941) is a Mexican artisan who work in lacquer ware and the revival of using gold leaf in this craft earned him the National Prize for Arts and Sciences in Mexico, among other recognitions. He was born in a very poor family in Olinalá, Guerrero, a town noted for its history with gold and lacquer work. Beginning at age seven, he created lacquer pieces for sale, reintroducing gold leaf into his works in the 1970s. His work has been exhibited in Mexico and the United States, with two pieces made as gifts for Queen Elizabeth II and Pope John Paul II.

== Craft traditions of Olinalá ==
Coronel Navarro was born in Olinalá in the Mexican state of Guerrero. Located in the La Montaña region of the state, northeast of the state capital, the town has been noted for its handcrafts since before the Spanish Conquest of Mexico, when artisans of the area paid tribute to the Aztecs making gilded gourd pieces. This tradition continued into the colonial period when lacquer techniques were added along with European taste for floral designs as well as influence from lacquered products imported on the Manila galleon.

== Career ==
Coronel Navarro, nicknamed Chico, was born in a very poor family and for this reason did not go to school. Instead, when he was seven, he began working, learning lacquer and gold leaf techniques from his grandfather and parents to make items to sell at fairs in nearby towns such as Tlapa de Comonfort, Tepalzcingo, Tejalpa and Petalcingo.

The artisan has exhibited his work in Mexico City, at venues such as the Museo Nacional de Culturas Populares and at the Mexican Cultural Institute in Washington DC. He has created works for corporations such as Banamex and two of his pieces were created to be used as gifts to Queen Elizabeth II and Pope John Paul II. He has won over thirty major awards including the 2007 National Prize for Arts and Sciences, received from Mexican President Felipe Calderón. He used the 450,000 peso prize money from this award to expand his workshop and buy supplies.

Coronel Navarro has also actively taught the next generations of craftspeople in his home state, including all eight of his children, five of whom make a living like their father.

== Artistry ==
The artisan won the National Prize for Arts and Sciences for reviving the use of gold and silver leaf in Mexican lacquer ware in the 1970s. Before this time, such work had been abandoned because of its cost on both money and time.

Although he creates trays and other smaller items, he specializes in larger pieces such as folding screen and especially boxes and chests. He is the only artisan in the town that takes individual orders. For smaller pieces he uses a soft local wood called copal, but the larger pieces are made by local carpenters of lináloe (Bursera linanoe), pine and ayacahuite. He also makes a kind of sewing chest, using a kind of large dried gourd.

The lacquer process begins with sanding the piece well, then adding a coat of varnish made from chia seed and mineral oils, making his own chia seed oil using traditional methods. Then the piece is burnished completely with a smooth stone. Colors are made with minerals, anilines and other materials obtained locally. After the lacquering and decorating is complete, the drying process can take up to a month. Colors are added one by one and allowed to dry before the next is added. He does not use stencils nor repeats designs exactly, creating his works spontaneously, using brushes made from bird feathers or cat hair because they allow for fine lines. When gold or silver leaf is used, it is applied in fine sheets and then burnished and can be used as the background and painted over. The decoration commonly contains images of flowers, plants and animals.
