= Gorky González Quiñones =

Mexican potter (1939–2017)

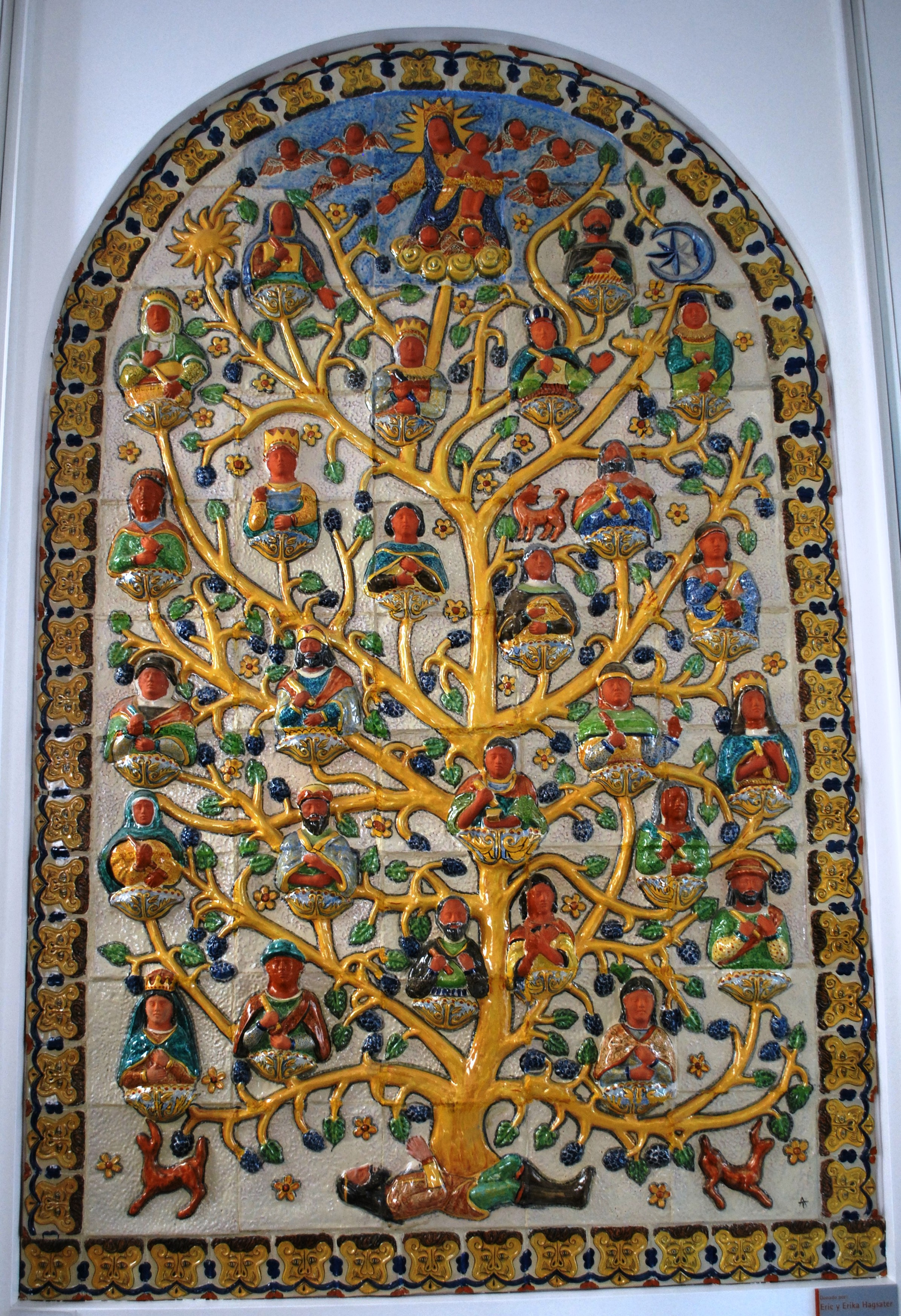
- Arbol genealogico del comienzo del mestizaje (Genealogy tree of the beginning of the mestizo) by the artisan at the Museo de Arte Popular
- Born: September 27, 1939; Morelia, Michoacán
- Died: January 15, 2017 (aged 77)
- Education: Instituto Allende; Escuela de Artes
- Known for: His efforts to revive Mexican maiolica pottery
- Movement: Maiolica
- Awards: National Prize for Arts

Gorky González Quiñones (September 27, 1939 – January 15, 2017) was a Mexican potter who worked in reviving the Mexican maiolica pottery craft.

He began in the arts following his father, sculptor Rodolfo González. Although he worked with and studied ceramics in Mexico and Japan, he did not work with maiolica until he received two pieces as part of his antique business. The technique had almost died out in his region, and González Quiñones learned how to make them. His workshop was in Guanajuato, with a client base in Mexico and the United States. In 1992, he was awarded the National Prize for Arts and Sciences in the Popular arts and traditions category.

== Life ==
González Quiñones was born in Morelia, Michoacán, the son of sculptor Rodolfo González. His interest in art began young, learning from his father how to make decorative and artistic items with the lost-wax casting methods as well as sculpting in various materials including clay.

In 1962, he went to San Miguel de Allende to study at the Instituto Allende and the Escuelas de Artes, learning artistic casting. There he founded a terra cotta workshop, reproducing the designs of Gene Byron, a Canadian artist in Mexico.

He gained a reputation for his ceramic work and at the same time, met a young Japanese exchange student in Mexico named Hisato Murayama, who lent him books on Japanese arts. This eventually led to a two-year scholarship to study ceramics in Japan, first studying shigaraki ware under Tsuji Seimei in Tokyo and then moving to Bizen, Okayama, to study under Kei Fujiwara.

While in Japan he met his wife Tashiko Ono, with whom he had two sons: his younger one, Gorky González Ono, has taken over the day-to-day operation at his workshop.

González Quiñones died on January 15, 2017, aged 77.

== Career ==
After he returned from Japan, he opened an antique shop. There he received two antique maiolica pots. He asked his father about them, then began investigating the glazed wares, which were introduced to Mexico by the Spanish. The art form nearly extinct, González Quiñones decided to work to revive it.

González Quiñones then went on to establish a maiolica workshop next to his home, in the city of Guanajuato. The studio enjoys a client base that extends throughout Mexico and into various parts of the United States, mostly small gift galleries, as well as FONART and the Museo de Arte Popular. Today one of his sons manages the business and, as a graduate of the Monterrey Institute of Technology and Higher Studies, has worked to modernize both the manufacturing and marketing of the ceramics.

González Quiñones's work has been exhibited both in Mexico and abroad. He exhibited in New York in 1966, Tokyo in 1967, the Expo Montreal in Canada in 1968, New World Ceramic Festival in Italy in 1990 and the Franz Mayer Museum in 2002.

== Awards and honors ==
Throughout his career, he has received multiple awards for his work, the two most notable being, the National Prize for Arts and Sciences in the Popular arts and traditions category in 1992, awarded for the revival of Mexican maiolica pottery, and the Premio Fomento Cultural Banamex in 1996.

González Quiñones's other honors included; first place at the Feria del Hogar in Mexico City (1964), a permanent display of his work at the Museo de Arte Popular of FONART in 1970, first place at the Concurso Nacional de Arte Popular in Aguascalientes (1975), second place at the Concurso Nacional de Artesanías in Irapuato (1976), International Tourism and Hotel Services Prize (1977), Premio Pantaleón Panduro from the State of Jalisco (1988), a recognition from the Guanajuato state government (1992), Premio Miguel Hidalgo from the state of Guanajuato (1993), the Pípila Trophy from the Club de Leones de Marfil (1994), Gran Salón de Grandes Maestros del Arte Popular Mexicano (1996), Premio 150 Grandes Maestros del Arte Popular Mexicano (1996), Premio al Mérito de Comercialización Otorgado por la Concanaco y Servitur (1998) and a recognition from the Secretaría de Relaciones Exteriores (1999).

== Artistry ==
González Quiñones employed traditional materials and kept most of the longstanding methods. However, he produced both traditional and contemporary designs, with the clay coming from the nearby Sierra de Santa Rosa. The artist used both molds and turntables with 95% of his round items having been made on the latter. His colors and designs were relatively conservative, using mineral paints such as copper oxide for green, antimony for yellow and cobalt for blue, all prepared locally.

He used kilns made from heat-resistant cinderblock, which had wood, gas and other materials for fuel. They were fired twice with the second to fix the glaze.
