= Agustín Parra Echauri =

Agustín Parra Echauri (born April 8, 1960) is a Mexican artist and artisan mostly noted for his work in creating religious images and other works in Mexican colonial style, credited to reviving interest in that era's styles and techniques. He has exhibited his work in Mexico, the United States and Spain and has been commissioned to make furniture and other items for three popes. He works in Tlaquepaque, Jalisco where he owns two shops.

== Life ==
Parra Echauri was born in Tepic, Nayarit, the eighth of ten children born to José Parra Villalpando, a sculptor trained at the Academy of San Carlos, and María del Refugio Partida Echauri. When he was a child, he frequently visited the Tepic Cathedral, located near his school and admired the artwork. When he was ten, people began to pay him to draw Christmas cards.

He moved to Guadalajara when he was twelve. He studied high school for two years at the Master Cultural Cabañas Bribiesca, then received his bachelor's degree in business administration from the University of Guadalajara.

Today he lives and works in Tlaquepaque, Jalisco, where he owns two shops, one dedicated to his own work.

== Career ==
Parra Echauri has had a career of over 35 years, founding his own business in 1985 specifically to create colonial era style artwork, as well as frames, tables, benches and cabinets. He sells his work to hotels, restaurants, haciendas and decoration centers.

The artist has held exhibitions in Mexico, Spain and the United States including the Expo Muebla Guadalajara (1998, 1999), the International Home Furnishing Market in High Point, NC (1991-1999), Exposición Mueble in Monterrey (1989), the Feria Internacional de Seville, Spain (1992), the Feria del Mueble, Valencia, Spain (1992), the Feria del Muebla y Decoración (2003) and the Expo Galería Nacional in Costa Rica (2005).

In 1999 he was commissioned to m a papal chair along with 35 other pieces for the visit of John Paul II, and created more works for this pope's return visit in 2002. In 2012 he created the furniture for the visit of Pope Benedict XVI. In 2007, to mark the fifteenth anniversary of diplomatic relations between Mexico and the Vatican, he was commissioned to create a nativity scene and other Christmas decorations. A replica of the nativity scene was created to be exhibited in Guadalajara.

He has also created pieces for the San Fernando Cathedral and the Mission San José in San Antonio, Texas. A towering altarpiece of his was featured when the latter was reopened in 2011.

His work has received various recognitions. In 1998 he was recognized by the Ocho Columnas de Oro newspaper for his efforts to revive colonial era art. The government of the state of Jalisco has named him a "distinguished craftsman" and the Fomento Cultural Banamex named him a "grand master." In 2004, a book about him called Agustín Parra:barroco mexicnao was published by Amaroma Ediciones.

== Artistry ==
Parra Echauri is a self-taught painter, sculptor, designer, altarpiece and furniture maker and is credited with reviving interest in Mexican colonial art. He prefers commissions for religious art in colonial style, valuing their realism and drama, with lifelike veins and skin textures, poses in motion and faces with feeling. The artist says that "it moves his heart" to see how paint can wear off of images of Christ because worshippers tap and rub the images' hands, feet and knees.

All pieces are made individually, and he tries to maintain as many of the colonial era methods as possible, many from the 17th century, but some as old as 14th century Italy. He mixes paint to order, cures wood for carving, (preferring Montezuma Cypress (Taxodium mucronatum), Mexican white pine (Pinus ayacahuite), walnut, cedar and orange woods) and works with materials such as dirt, egg yolks, red clay and a type of glue made from rabbit collagen. Although there are modern substitutions for these, he believes that the old methods and ingredients are why colonial artwork has lasted so long. For example, he is an expert in estofado, or the covering of wooden sculptures, usually religious images, in plaster before decorating them with gold leaf and/or paint.
