= Alberto Bautista Gómez =

Mexican potter

Alberto Bautista Gómez is a Mexican potter from Amatenango del Valle, Chiapas. It is a Tzeltal community with a long tradition of pottery making, many learning the craft as children. His grandmother taught him to work with clay when he was fifteen, first making cookware and flowerpots. He then moved on to more decorative items, such as figures of birds, women and children, which became imitated by others in the community. He then began to create lamps in the form of giant tigers and tiger heads, painted in natural colors, which became prized for their artistic quality and have since evolved into sculptures in their own right. Other innovations of his have been to create large vases called “cántaros” with raised designs, and the addition of colored sand and crushed stone to create darker colors and different textures. He works with his wife, Simona López Pérez, obtaining his materials locally and creating most of his works by hand, occasionally using some crude molds.
