= Miguel Chan and Roger Juárez =

Mexican potters in Mayan culture-inspired pottery

Miguel Chan and Roger Juárez are Mexican potters, partners in producing Mayan culture-inspired pottery in Ticul, in the state of Yucatán. Ticul, along with Mama and Maxcanú are traditional pottery centers for the state, where pieces are made using a k´abal, a rudimentary form of pottery wheel. The pieces are decorated using implements that they make themselves from branches, leather, gourds and feathers.

The partners have worked together for many years as the “Arte Maya” workshop, which was formerly directed by Wilbert Gonzalez before he died. The two learned the craft together here, producing cups, storage boxes, cantaros, vases and decorative figures, inspired by the old gods and sacred animals and myths of the Maya. Their pieces are principally made on the k’abal, which they turn with their feet, either using the coil method or forming the piece from a single ball of clay.

Chan is the more versatile of the two, making everything from utilitarian pieces to reproduction of Jaina figures, the latter made with special molds along with modeling. Juarez specializes in creating plates and containers with Mayan inspired designs, creating using tones of red and yellow clay slips, which are burnished before firing.

Firing is done in kilns they have constructed, which contain a type of ventilation unique to the pottery of the region along with the use of a grill to keep pieces from being stained by the burning wood. After firing some pieces are further decorated with vinyl paints and others are left in natural clay tones, which can include a type of blue associated with the ancient Mayans.

Their work has been recognized by being named “grand masters” by the Fomento Cultural Banamex.
