= José Reyes Juárez =

José Reyes Juárez is a Mexican mask maker for traditional dances in the state of Tlaxcala. His work has earned him the title of “grand master” from the Fomento Cultural Banamex.

Reyes Juárez is from a small community called Tlatempan, in the municipality of San Pablo Apetatitlán, Tlaxcala. The making of masks is a family tradition, begun when his grandfather went to Huejotzingo, Puebla to learn how to make them. This knowledge was passed on to Reyes Juárez's father, then down to him. For some time, the family was the only one in Tlaxcala that made traditional masks.

The artisan has had a career of over forty years and the family is well known for their work, masking the masks for almost all of the carnival celebrations in the state of Tlaxcala. His techniques are very similar to those of the colonial period and does not use molds or models, rather he sculpts designs from memory. Most of the masks are related to traditional dances such as the Danza de Cuadrillas, Cuatro Estaciones, Taragotas, Francesas, Los catrines de levita and La gota. The last two are danced only in San Juan Totolac. He uses wood from a pine called ayacahuite bought locally. After the mask is sculpted, it is covered in plaster painted then varnished.

The artisan also makes and repairs religious images to order.
