= Pablo Dolores Regino =

Pablo Dolores Regino is a Mexican lacquer artisan from Temalacatzingo, Guerrero.

He began learning traditional lacquer techniques when he was a small child and today he runs one of the most important workshops in his small town in an area known for lacquer ware. Dolores Regino’s creations are made from a variety of gourd called cucurbita, which has a hard shell especially when dried, and comes in a variety of shapes and sizes which he uses to create various figures and objects. Finished products include toys such as carrousels, Ferris wheels, animal figures (birds, fish, armadillos etc.) as well as boxes and other storage containers for small items such as sewing supplies and jewelry. He also makes nativity scenes.

Dolores Regino works with his son-in-law Julio Santos at their workshop and property where the crafts are made from growing the gourds to the finished product. After the various sizes and types of gourd are harvested, the insides are cleaned out and the hard shell is left to dry. The outer shell is lacquered with chia (preferably), linseed or other oil, and then painted with tlapilole, a powder with coloring that serves as the base. The piece is then burnished to make sure the tlapilole is well-set and the process is repeated to make sure the gourd is well sealed.

After drying, the piece is ready to be decorated, usually with traditional floral designs of Guerrero. The designs tend to be less dense than those of neighboring Olinalá and usually include animals such as birds, rabbits, deer, owls and more. The colors are made from earth and other natural pigments mixed with chia or linseed oil.

The artisan has been able to market his goods in other parts of Mexico, exhibiting it in venues such as the Palace of Iturbide in Mexico City. In 2001, the Fomento Cultural Banamex named him a “Grand Master” of Mexican folk art and in 2010, his work “Diablo” won honorable mention at the seventh “Living Legends” (Leyendas vivientes) event sponsored by FONART.
