= Celso Camacho Quiroz =

Celso Camacho Quiroz is a fourth-generation Mexican potter who works in Metepec, in the State of Mexico. His specialty is the making of large cooking vessels called “cazuelas,” traditionally used to cook mole and rice, but he also makes a number of other utilitarian and decorative pieces. His work has been recognized with awards such as the Gran Premio de Arte Popular from FONART in 1999 and being named a “grand master” by the Fomento Cultural Banamex in 2003.

== Life ==
Camacho Quiroz is a fourth generation potter, learning the craft from his parents. Both his parents worked in clay, with his father specializing in the making of incense burners and small items such as cups. His mother specialized in large cooking pots called “cazuelas,” traditionally used for making mole and rice. He began working in clay as a small child, helping his mother create cups and other small vessels which provides most of the family's income at the time. They shaped pieces from Monday to Friday, with firing done on weekends and sell and even trade them for other goods at the traditional “tianguis” market in Metepec. Camacho Quiroz continued working in ceramics even though he attended university. He left school when his parents died, first his father and soon after, his mother. All of his siblings also learned to work in clay and relied on it for income at some point in their lives, but today only the boys of the family are still potters.

Today, the artisan works with his wife and children. His wife, Ivette Camacho Rodriguez, studied ceramics at the Centro Cultural MOA. She makes pieces in Talavera style and has won awards in competitions in Metepec and with FONART. She also teaches her techniques to pre schoolers. His two children also work in ceramics and have participated in artistic competitions for youth organized by the government of Metepec.

== Career ==
Camacho Quiroz is best known for his large cazuela cooking pots, which are a traditional ware in Metepec. Most of his income derives from them, but most are not sold for cooking but rather as decorative elements and can be found on walls in homes, restaurants and offices. He also makes large and small flowerpots, jugs for serving pulque and various other utilitarian and decorative pieces. Certain pieces, such as trees of life, are made only to order.

His work can be found part of the collections of the Frankfurt Museum and other museums in Europe. He regularly competes in Metepec's most important competition, the Leyendas Vivientes de FONART.

The artisan has won various important recognitions for his work such as the Gran Premio de Arte Popular from FONART in 1999, and awards at the Premio Nacional de Arte Popular in Oaxaca and the Concurso Nacional de Cerámica in Tlaquepaque, Jalisco. He was named a “grand master” by the Fomento Cultural Banamex in 2003.

== Artistry ==
Camacho Quiroz works with red and yellow clays mined from the nearby town of Ocotitlán. He cleans the masses and along with others in this town, engages in the tradition of laying the clays on the street to be pulverized by passing cars. The final grinding to a powder is done by hand with a heavy stone in small quantities. To work the clay into forms, it is first wetted and then “plumilla” cattail fluff is added as a temper. Certain pieces, such as flowerpots are made using molds, pressing thin “pancakes” of clay into shape. Then pieces are dried in the sun before being smoothed with stones and other tools. Firing is done in a circular kiln. The first time is done terra cotta and the second is done after painting and glazing.

His specialty is the making of large, heavy cooking vessels called “cazuelas.” As many of his pieces are used for decoration, motifs are important. Turkeys appear frequently as a decorative element in his work, “as a traditional sign of America.” He also paints butterflies, as symbols of perfection and strength. Other designs include various plants, animals and flowers.

He changed to non-leaded glazes in order to be able to sell his ware more widely in Mexico and abroad. He has been experimenting with ceramics of higher temperatures and other techniques, combining them with more traditional ones.
