= María Lilia Calam Que =

María Lilia Calam Que is a Mexican potter from Tepakán, Campeche in southern Mexico, who specializes in water storage containers called cántaros. Her hometown was known for the making of these vessels but she is one of a handful of potters left who makes them, along with Teodora Cajúm, Claudia Pech Chi, Justina Kan and Rosalía Pan.

Calam Que learned the craft from her mother as a child and her wares stand out for their Mayan designs. The pieces are made of clay which are coated in a slip. Her pieces usually begin with a base made though the use of moulds, then the sides are built up with the coil method, using only a rudimentary wheel to turn the piece.

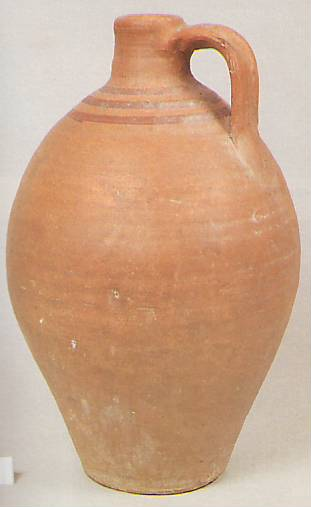
A cantaro from Guadalajara, Spain.

In addition to the cántaros, she also makes incense burners, candle holders and various other containers, especially for offerings for Day of the Dead.

In 2001, she was named a “grand master” by the Fomento Cultural Banamex and featured in the book Grandes Maestros del Arte Popular.
