= Apolinar Hernández Balcazar =

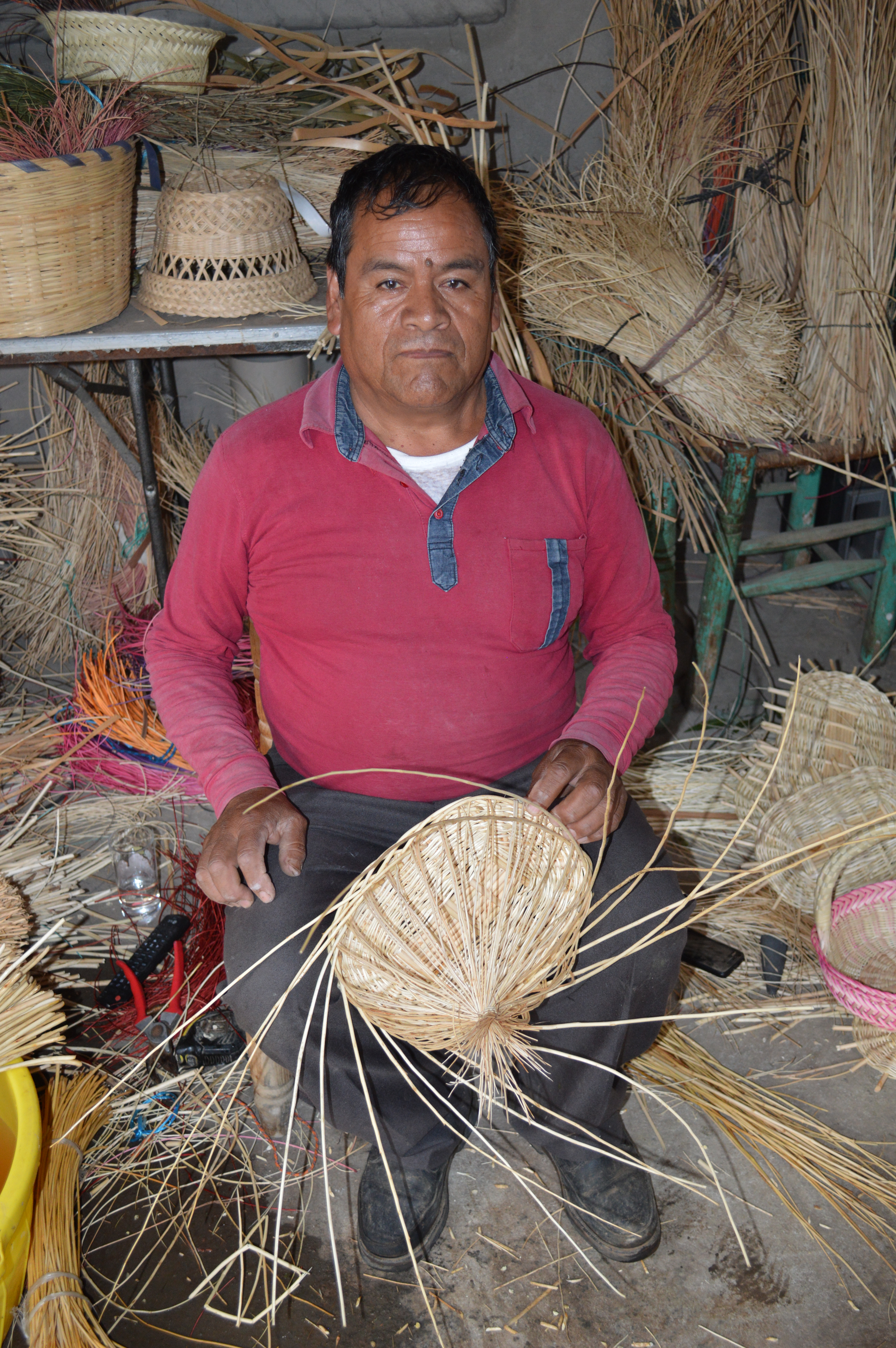
The artisan with partially completed basket at the family workshop in San Martin Coapaxtongo, Tenancingo

Apolinar Hernandez Balcazar is a Mexican basket maker from San Martin Coapaxton, Tenancingo, State of Mexico, whose work has won various national awards.

The artisan lives in a rural area in central Mexico among orchards and cornfields, with pine forests in the higher mountains. He works on his corn fields during the rainy season, concentrating on his weaving during the rest of the year. He learned basket weaving from his father, admiring the elder’s work and has tried to teach the same appreciation to this own children. He has also taught many other young people.

Hernandez Balcazar’s workshop is the patio of his house and the family participates in the production, making mostly various baskets, and holders for fruit, tortillas and eggs. They also make baskets to hold gifts. He works with reeds and tender branches from three types of willow and other trees which he either buys or collects himself in the countryside. Before weaving the fibers are soaked in water to make them more pliable. He generally uses his hands but if the piece is large, the feet are involved as well. A basket typically takes one 10-hour workday with the largest ones taking a week or more. Colors and textures are created by combining materials. Patterns are created with various weaving techniques and combinations of materials and the most commons patterns are diagonal, crosshatched, geometric, triangular, squared and zigzag. The outsides are done as perfectly as possible, with knots and other imperfection left in the interior. He does not use dyes because he does not like how they look.

The pieces are mostly sold in state markets, through middlemen and sometimes directly to customers.

Hernandez Balcazar has won national awards in Mexico and has a small, loyal group of collectors that pay anywhere from eight to 150 dollars for his work. His work can be found in collections such as that of FONART. In 2001, he was named a “grand master” by the Fomento Cultural Banamex and an honorable mention at the Gran Premio de Arte Popular in 2010.
