= Hilario Alejos Madrigal =

Mexican potter

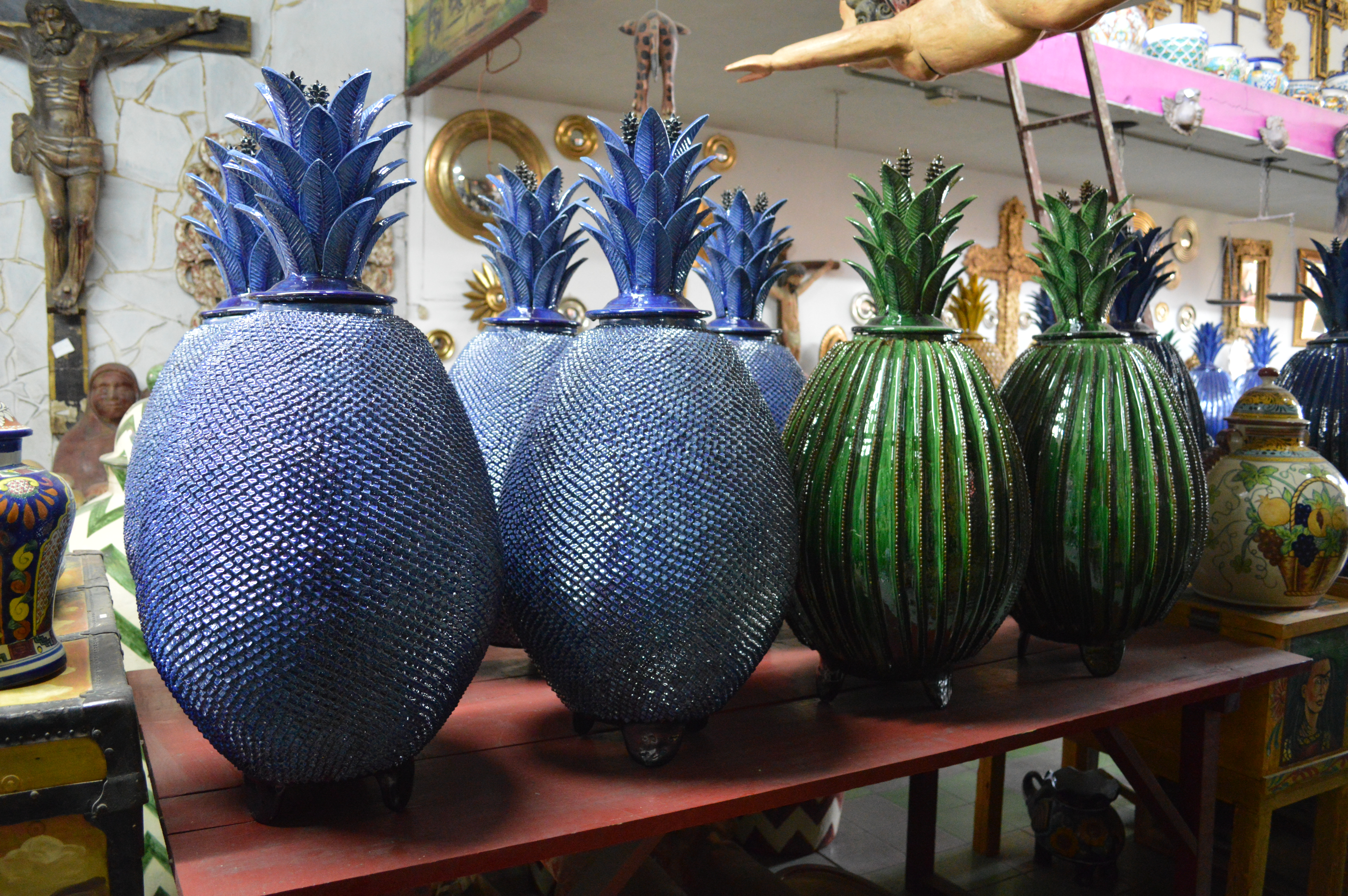
"Pineapple" pieces by the artisan

Hilario Alejos Madrigal is a Mexican potter from a small town in the state of Michoacán, known for his “pineapple” ceramic wares. The name comes from the original form which was created by his mother, potter Elisa Madrigal Martinez, who created punch bowls in the shape of pineapples. Alejos Madriga's variations include bowls, candelabras and more, with the version done in a green glaze be best known. Alejos Madrigal has won awards for his work, which is featured on the cover of large reference book Grandes Maestros del Arte Popular Mexicano by Fomento Cultural Banamex.

== Biography ==
Alejos Madrigal is from San José de Gracia, Michoacán. His mother was Elisa Madrigal Martinez, from Carapan, Michoacán. When she moved to San José de Gracia as a potter, she decided to create something different than the town's traditional saucepans, making punch bowls in the shape of pineapples, even gaining recognition for them. She then began to use the pineapple motif to create other items. Alejos Madrigal began to learn pottery at age fifteen from this mother, along with his brothers Jose Maria, Emilio and Bulmaro who also have workshops in the same town. This family's work has spurred the pottery tradition here to diversity and become more creative. Today Alejos Madrigal works with his wife, Audelia Cerano and children Elizabeth, Gabriela, Osbaldo, Andrea and Lupita at the family studio, which is attached to their house.

== ”Pineapple” ware ==
At first Alejos Madrigal made utilitarian items, but when he became interested in participating in competitions, he began to adapt his mother's pineapple motifs. He became known for green glazed “pineapple” wares, designed to be pots, punch bowls, candelabras and other wares. In addition to green, he also makes pieces in yellow and blue, all requiring skill and dexterity to create their detailed decorations. The best known types of pineapple pieces are those called biznaga (barrel cactus) and conchita (small shell). The former is like a cross between a cactus and a pineapple and the latter is named from the tiny shell-shaped pieces of the pineapple “skin.”

== Creating the pieces ==
Each pineapple piece takes about one week to create from start to finish, mostly done with appliqué and openwork techniques. Alejos Madrigal uses two types of clay from a deposit just outside the town, one chosen for its resistance to heat and the other to support the structure. The original shape is created with clay, disks, and molds, but the intricate decorative and textural elements are made by hand, generally by pinching. When the piece is completely formed, it is covered in a white clay slip to serve as a base, then fired for five hours. After cooling, the pieces are then covered in a lead oxide or copper oxide glaze to create the color plus silica for the shine. The pieces are then fired a second time for five hours.

The artisan states that much imagination is needed in order to create pieces.

== Recognition ==
Alejos Madrigal has received various recognitions for his work, and his pieces are among the most recognized in Mexico. He has won first and second prizes at events such as Noche de Muertos and Domingo de Ramos contests in Pátzcuaro and Uruapan in Michoacan. He received fourth prize at the Gran Premio de Arte Popular in Mexico City. He is featured in the large reference book Grandes Maestros del Arte Popular Mexicano by Fomento Cultural Banamex, with a biznaga pineapple on the cover.

== Sales ==
Alejos Madrigal sells most of his wares at various outlets in Michoacán for artisans, but has also sold in the United States, such as the Santa Fe International Folk Art Market from 2008 to 2012 His pieces are highly sought by collectors.
