= Pedro Ruiz =

Pedro Ruiz may refer to:

- Pedro Ruiz de Azagra (died 1186), Navarrese nobleman and soldier
- Pedro Ruiz de Villegas II (1304–1355), Spanish noble baron
- Pedro Ruíz Corredor (16th century), Spanish conquistador
- Pedro Ruiz de Velasco (1915–1996), Mexican businessman
- Pedro Ruiz Gallo (1838–1880), Peruvian polymath
- Pedro Ruiz Martínez and Odilia Pineda, Mexican husband and wife potters
- Pedro Ruiz Carrilero, a professional Valencian pilota player
- Pedro Ruiz (actor) (born 1947), Spanish radio presenter, actor, screenwriter and comedian
- Pedro Ruiz (artist), Colombian artist
- Pedro Ruíz (footballer, born 1947), Peruvian footballer
- Pedro Ruiz (footballer, born 2000), Spanish footballer
