= Margarita Cruz Sipuachi =

Mexican potter

Margarita Cruz Sipuach is a Mexican potter from Guachochi. She learned pottery from her mother, Filomena Sipuachi. Today, she creates various kinds of utilitarian and ceremonial wares, but her specialty is in a type of pot called “tesgüineras.” In 2001, she was named a “grand master” by the Fomento Cultural Banamex.
