= Arnulfo Mendoza =

Mexican artist (1954 - 2014)

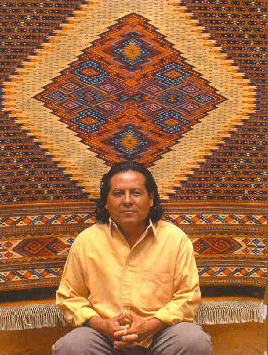

Arnulfo Mendoza Ruíz (August 17, 1954 – March 7, 2014) was an artist, cultural promotor, and weaver who exhibited his work within Mexico and internationally. Born in Teotitlán del Valle, Oaxaca, a well-known center of Zapotec weaving, he became one of its best-known artisans, recognized as a "Grand Master" by the Fomento cultural Banamex. He also belonged to the founding group of the Taller Rufino Tamayo in Oaxaca, called "The first generation of the Taller Rufino Tamayo" with artists such as Maximino Javier, Alejandro Santiago, Felipe Morales, Filemón Santiago, among others. He worked on the promotion and dissemination of contemporary art and Oaxacan folkart as director of the La Mano Mágica Gallery, together with his ex-wife Mary Jane Gagnier. The gallery and weaving workshop currently directed by his son Gabriel Mendoza Gagnier.

== Life ==
Mendoza was born in Teotitlán del Valle, Oaxaca, a Zapotec community near the state capital that is well known for its weaving of rugs. The residents have been successful enough in this endeavor that unlike many other communities in the region, few people emigrate from here.

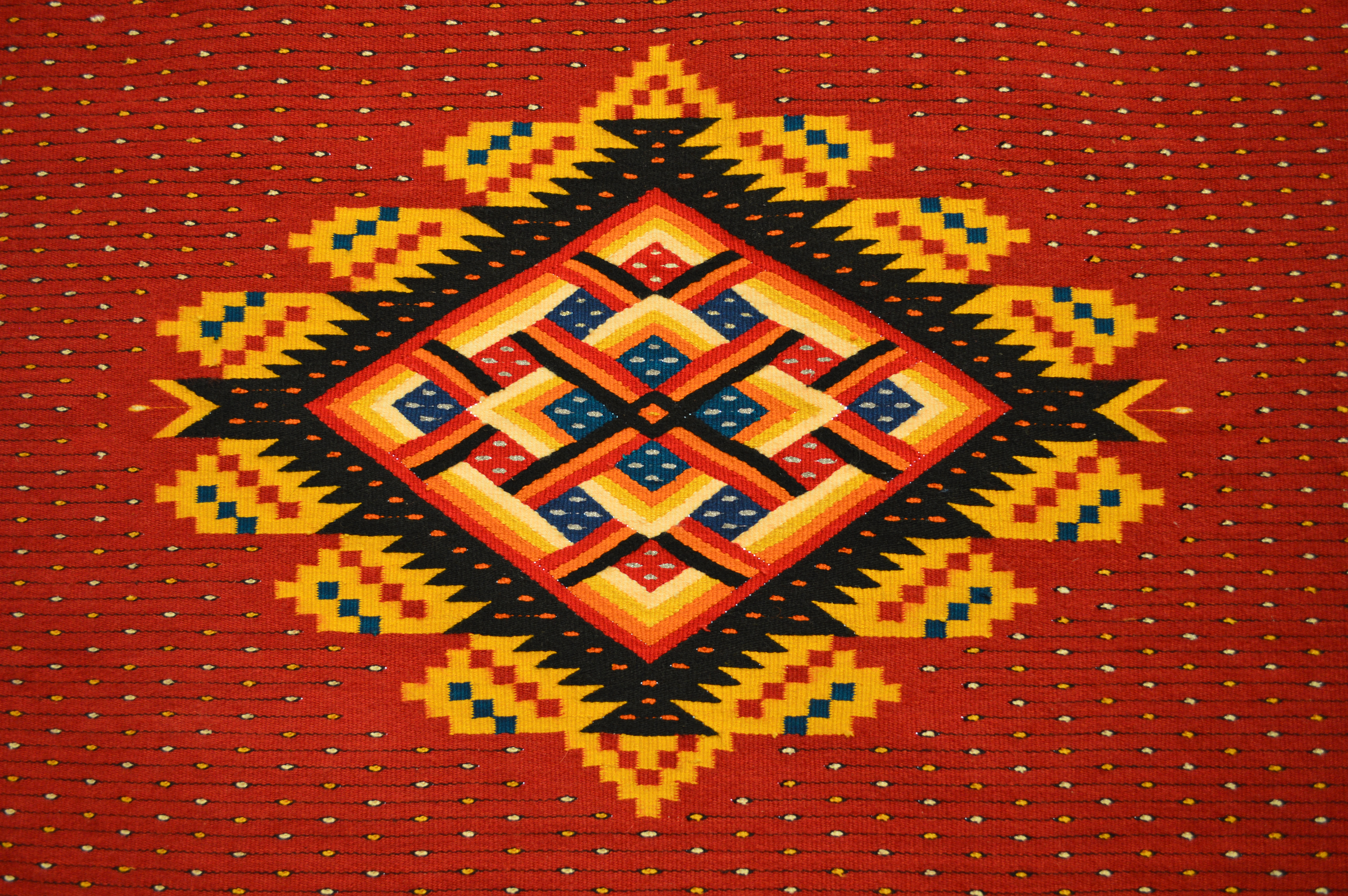
Zapotec rug in traditional diamond pattern by the artist

At age nine, he began his training in form, color and materials at his family's workshop, learning traditional Zapotec weaving. He went on to study at the school of fine arts at the Universidad Autónoma Benito Juárez de Oaxaca (UABJO) from 1972 to 1974.

Mendoza later married Canadian Mary Jane Gagnier, who had come to Teotitlán as a backpacker and fell in love with the area, as well as with him. They worked together to promote his work and that of other artisans in the central valleys of Oaxaca, by opening a gallery, La Mano Magica, and writing. The couple divorced but Mary Jane stayed in Oaxaca to continue this work. The couple has one son, Gabriel Mendoza Gagnier.

In 2014, Mendoza died unexpectedly of a heart attack at age 59. There was a wake in the city of Oaxaca as well as in his hometown, where he was buried.

== Career ==
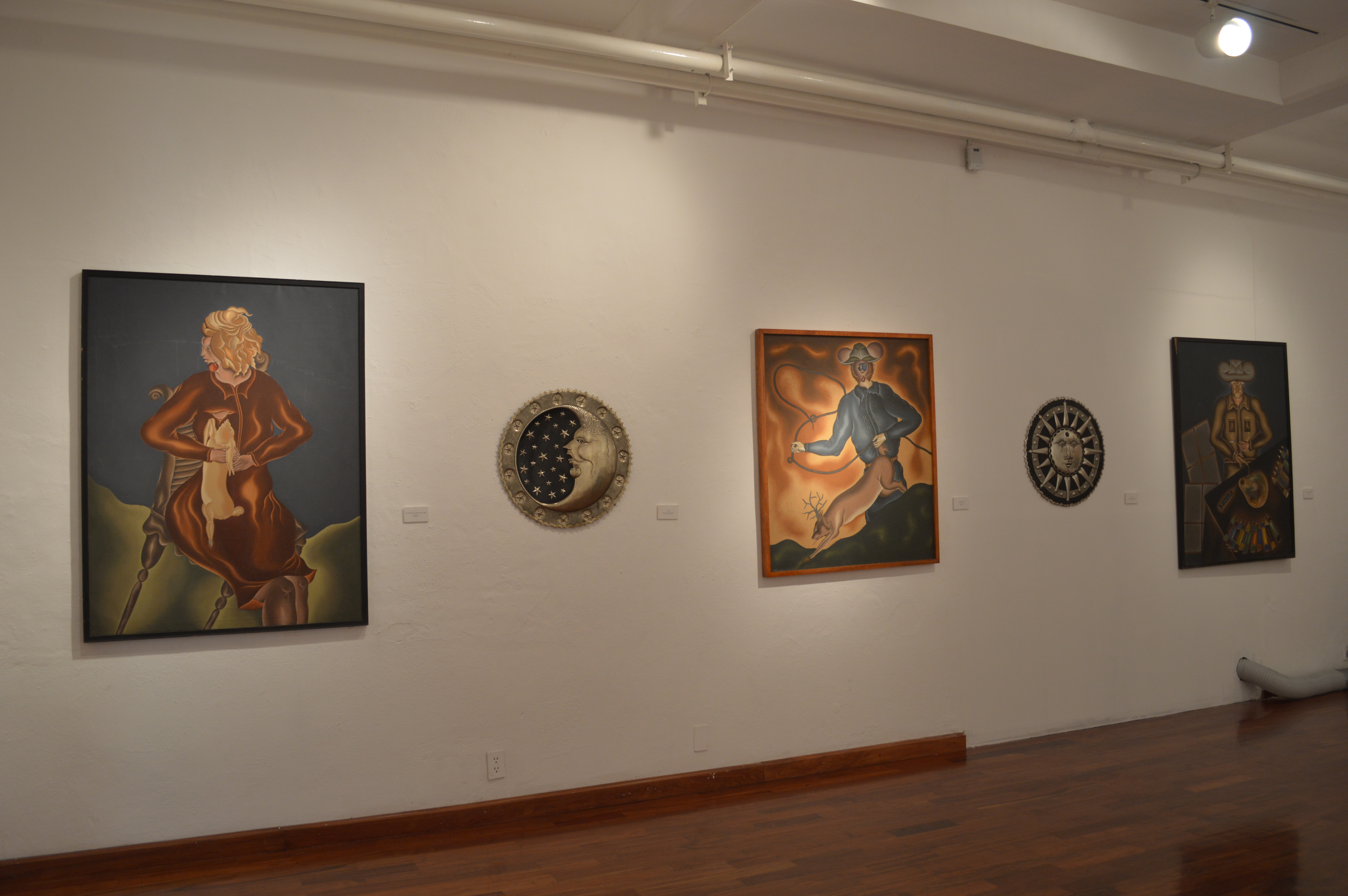
Display of works by the artist at the Museo de los Pintores Oaxaqueños in the city of Oaxaca, Mexico

Mendoza was one of Teotitlán's most famous weavers, whose works sold for up to thousands of dollars. He dyed his own silk and wool yarn and was particularly partial to the reds produced by the cochineal insect and sometimes used silver and gold thread. He had over fifty individual and collective exhibitions of his work, including in museums in New York, Madrid, Dallas, Paris, Los Angeles and Berlin. In 2003 his work was featured at the Weaving a Cultural Testimony exhibit at the Mexican Art Museum in Chicago . His work can be found in many private, and permanent collections of the Mexican Art Museum in Chicago, Tama Life 21 in Tokyo, Fundación Cultural Banamex, Waterloo Center for the Arts in Iowa and published in Cuento Mayas, Native Tradition (1982), Textiles de Oaxaca, Artes de México No.35 (1997) and Oaxaca Celebration (2005) .

Just after graduating from UABJO, he became one of the founding members of the Taller (Workshop) Rufino Tamayo in 1974. In 1975 he supervised the production of tapestries of 25 artists in the United States to an exhibition at the Otis Art Institute in Los Angeles .

In 1980 he traveled to Paris to paint for a year. From 1987 to 2010 he founded and directed the Arnulfo Mendoza Workshop, producing tapestries with traditional and contemporary designs.

In 1993 he participated in an International Art Project in Japan, with two of his works acquired by the largest public art collection in Tokyo.

From 2009 to 2010 he was the co-director of the La Mano Mágica Gallery, one of the most recognized in Oaxaca.

In 1996, the Fundación Cultural Banamex named him of one their "grandmasters" of Mexican folk art (Grandes Maestros del Arte Popular Mexicano). In 2001 he was awarded the Chimalli de Oro by the El Imparcial newspaper.

== See also ==
- List of Mexican artisans
