= Marcelino Vicente =

Mexican ceramicist (1933–1968)

Marcelino Vicente (1933–1968) was a ceramicist from Ocumicho, Michoacán, Mexico. He is known for popularizing the popular devil figurines of Ocumicho as well as creating one of the first gender-neutral spaces for ceramicists to work alongside each other.

== Career ==
Marcelino Vicente began producing his stylized devil-figurine tablets in the 1960s and were likely derived from Christian iconography and Purépecha and/or Spanish influence.

Despite the commercial success of Vicente's ceramic figurines he was often criticized for encroaching on "women's work" and for dressing in women's clothing. Vicente was central to introducing gender-ambiguity to Ocumicho's claywork space, until late October 22, 1968, when he was violently murdered outside of a bar in what was suspected to be a hate crime.

== Contributions ==
This artist was previously mentioned in an article about artist María de Jesús Nolasco Elías.
