= Leonarda Estrella Laureano =

Leonarda Estrella Laureano is a Mayo Mexican potter from Capomos, El Fuerte in Sinaloa.

She learned the craft from her mother and has since taught members of her family and various young people from her community.

She uses local materials: clay, sand, feathers and small pieces of rags, with smooth stones used to burnish. The pieces are distinguished with Mayo geometric patterns and color schemes, creating both traditional ceremonial pieces as well as new designs for sale.

In 2001, she was named a “grand master” by the Fomento Cultural Banamex.
