= Hipolito Vázquez Sánchez =

Hipolito Vázquez Sánchez is a Mexican woodcarver from San Esteban Tizatlán, Tlaxcala in central Mexico. His work has earned him numerous awards and recognitions, including being named a “grand master” by the Fomento Cultural Banamex.

His interest in carving began when he studied sculpture at the Escuela Nacional de Artes Plásticas and the Academy of San Carlos. After this he traveled to Egypt and India to learn wood carving and preservation techniques. Today he owns a furniture making workshop, with about forty employees. This is his source of income but he continues to do wood carving on his own.

His work has appeared in over 155 individual and collective exhibitions in both Mexico and abroad.

He generally works in poplar, cedar, mahogany and Indian sandalwood, and occasionally with cypress, using a large collection of cutting implements, which he has made himself. His best works are those made from a single piece of wood, often based on nativity scenes. Often these require the careful excavation of miniature figures. Other themes include those related to the sea, traditional festivals such as Day of the Dead and Mexican nationalism. He also makes elaborate canes to order.
