= Pineda Palacios family =

Mexican family of artisans

The Pineda Palacios is a Mexican family of artisans which specializes in the making of nativity scenes with figures made from palm fronds. Their work has been recognized by being named “grand masters” of Mexican handcrafts by the Fomento Cultural Banamex.

The family is from Santa María Chigmecatitlán in the state of Puebla, Mexico, headed by Emilia Pineda Palacios. She began the tradition of creating the figures after learning more traditional palm frond crafts such as the making of floor mats and fans.

The family works with two kinds of palm fronds, called “real” and “silvestre,” chosen for their flexibility and rigidity, respectively. They are bought locally from merchants who deliver. If the piece is to have color, the palm fronds are dyed in commercial enamel paint diluted with water.

The figures are created by hand, using weaving techniques to create three-dimensional figures. They are unique in this kind of craft and the pieces are sold individually and in sets, with the sets usually affixed to a small woven mat. The family also makes toys, Christmas tree ornaments and other figures that represent common people such as charros, cowboys, bicyclists, musicians, circus performers and more.
