= Aguirre family =

The Aguirre family is a Mexican artisan family specializing in inlaid wood items. Two of the family members, Silvano and Francisco, have been named "grand masters" of Mexican folk art by the Fomento Cultural Banamex.

The family is from Jalostotitlán, Jalisco in western Mexico, a town known for its inlaid wood products. The technique was brought to Mexico from Europe and has since then taken on Mexican elements especially in design.

Francisco Aguirre has dedicated his life to preserving the craft and reviving it, teaching his sons Silvano and Francisco. The elder learned the craft and a number of original designs from his own father. The family specializes in smaller objects such as storage boxes, mirror frames and animal figures made from mahogany and cypress using other woods such as orange and copal for the inlaid designs. These smaller, delicate pieces of wood are cut using a standard sewing machine. The smallest pieces require tweezers to lay them exactly right. They generally make pieces to order.

The family has earned a number of awards and other recognitions from organizations such as the Instituto Nacional de Bellas Artes y Literatura, the Casa de Artesanías de Jalisco and the Premio Fomento Cultural Banamex. The elder won major awards at the Feria de las Artesanías in Jalisco in 1969 and the Concurso Municipal de Artesanía in 1994.
