= Pedro Ruiz Martínez and Odilia Pineda =

Pedro Ruiz Martínez and Odilia Pineda are husband and wife Mexican potters, who work in Capula, Michoacán. This town is noted for its ceramics distinguished by having its designs painted on with small dots in a technique called “punteaje.”

The couple’s work is noted not only for its precise punteaje, but also the use of “petatillo”, the use of fine crosshatching used to fill in background space, normally associated with Jalisco pottery.

The couple works in their own workshop in the town, along with their children, to whom they have taught the craft. Using clay from local deposits, most pieces are formed with the use of molds, but some are formed by hand. Most of their pieces are pots with lids, cantaros, small jugs, miniature figures, water glasses with their own tray, platters, bowls. After forming and drying, the pieces are fired for the first time in wood or gas kilns. Then they are painted using commercial enamel paint mixed with a slip. Principal decorative elements are daisies, fish and butterflies. Then the pieces are glazed and fired a second time.

The couple were named "grand masters" by the Fomento Cultural Banamex in 2001.
