= Cesar Torres Ramírez =

Mexican potter

Cesar Torres Ramírez is a Mexican potter who specialized in the country Talavera pottery tradition. His work has been featured in books such as Cerámica Y Cultura: The Story of Spanish and Mexican Mayólica of the Museum of International Folk Art in New Mexico, in the Grandes Maestros de Arte Popular Mexicano as a “grand master” by the Fomento Cultural Banamex and as one of Mexico's best artisans in a documentary on Canal Once in Mexico.

In his workshop in Puebla, Torres Ramírez continues the Talavera pottery tradition, which was brought over from Spain and reinterpreted in the city of Puebla. Although there have been some recent innovations, most pieces are still made as they were in the 16th century. The artisan remains faithful to the original forms and decorative designs, best known for his reproduction of antique pieces such as bowls, platters, boxes, fruit bowls, candelabras and large lidded jars called tibores.

He works with white and black clays from the nearby Loreto and Guadalupe hills, using the techniques he was taught by his grandfather. Pieces are made by molding and/or with a potter's wheel. After the pieces take shape, they are left to day in a windowless room for up to a month. Then they spend some time in the sun before they are fired for the first time using modern gas kilns. These pieces are then bathed in a white background glaze of tin and lead. When this is dry, traditional designs in traditional colors (blue, yellow, red, green, black and white) are painted on top. The colors are painted one with paintbrushes of different widths, preferably ones from Japan. When this is dry, the pieces are fired a second time.
