= Doña Rosa =

Mexican potter (1900–1980)

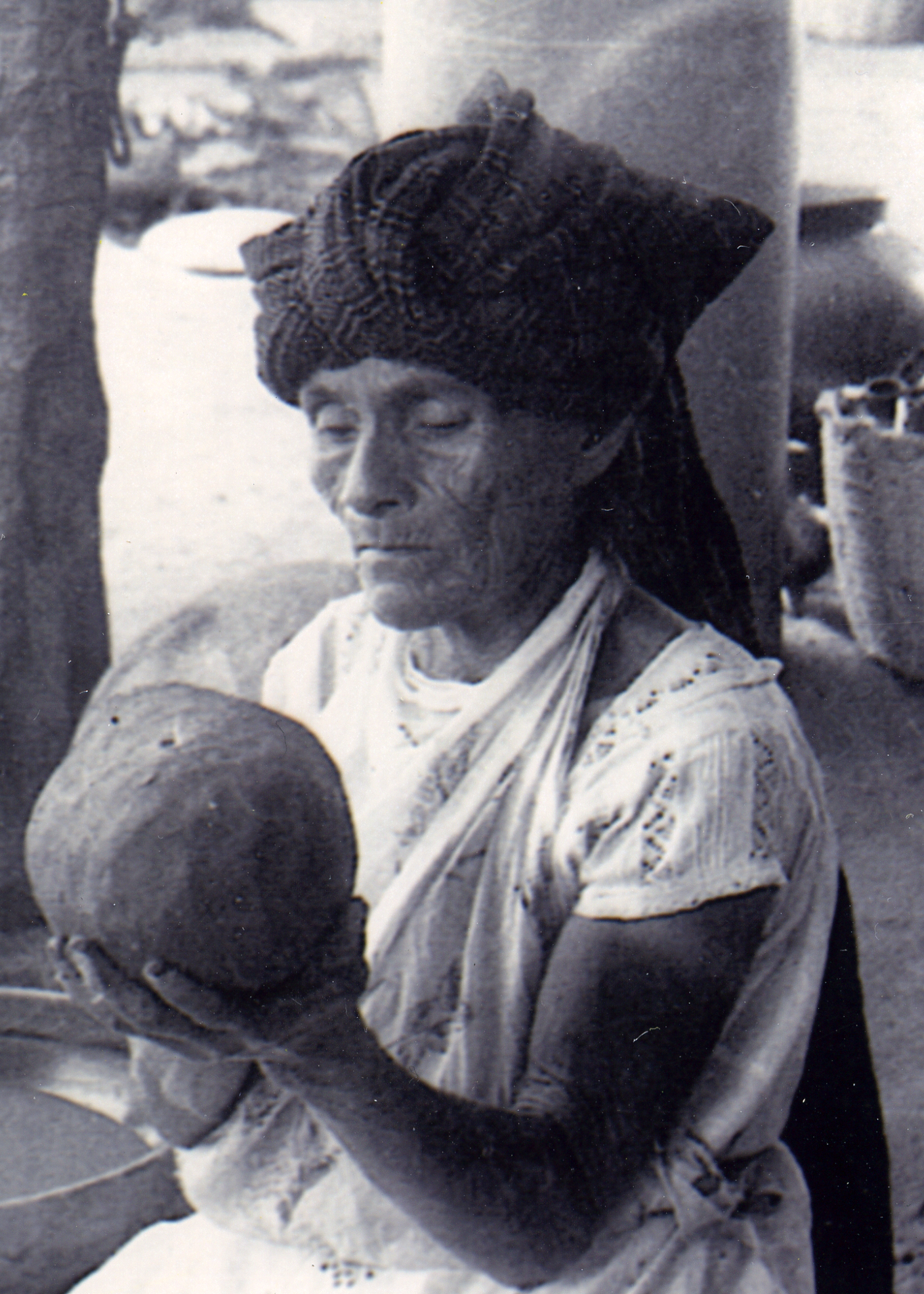
Doña Rosa (1980)

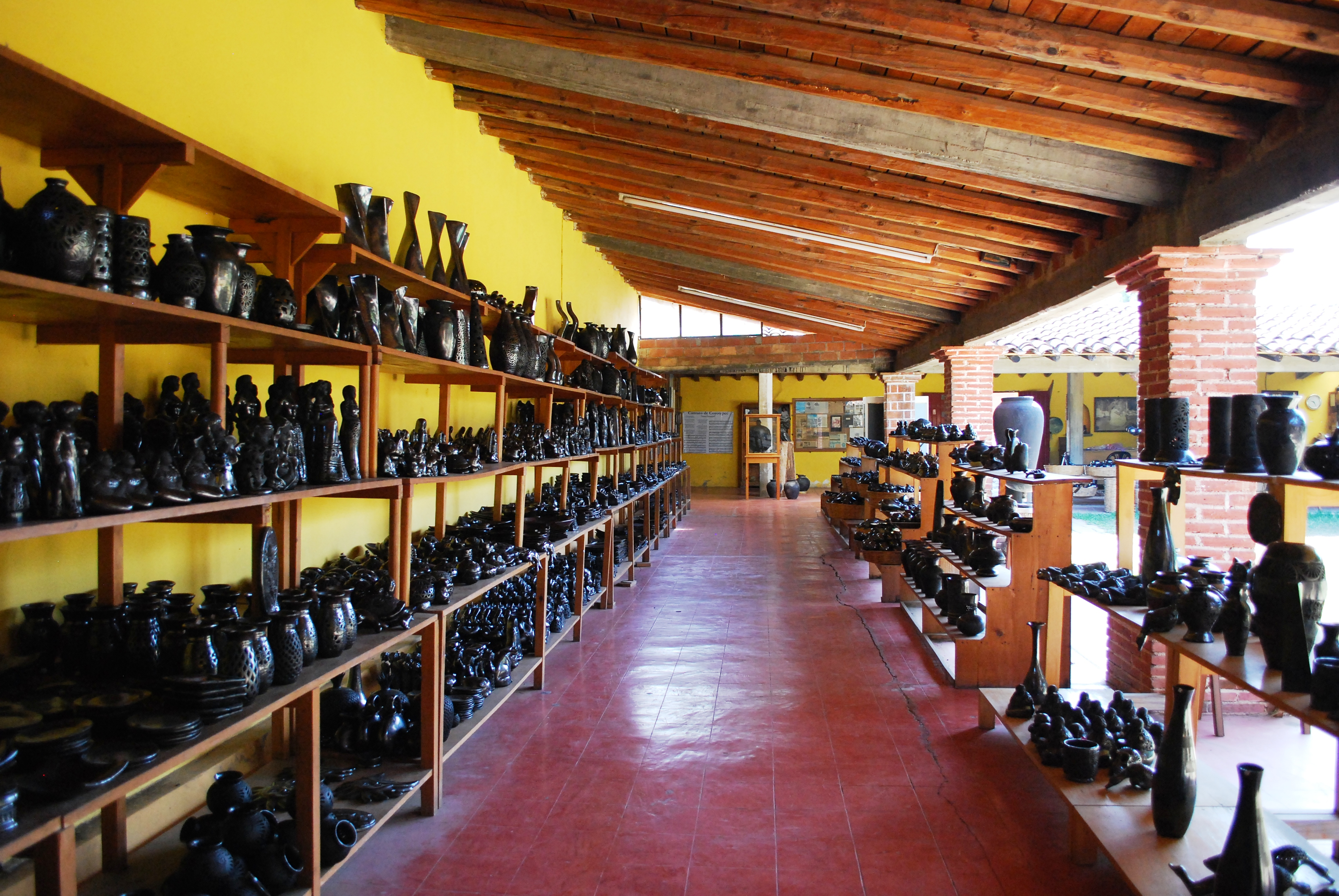
Doña Rosa’s family’s workshop and store in San Bartolo Coyotepec

Doña Rosa, full name Rosa Real Mateo de Nieto, was a Mexican ceramics artisan from San Bartolo Coyotepec, Oaxaca, Mexico. She is noted for inventing a technique to make the local pottery type, barro negro, black and shiny after firing. This created new markets for the ceramics with collectors and tourists.

The origins of barro negro pottery extend over centuries, with examples of it found at a number of Mexican archeological sites, fashioned mostly into jars and other utilitarian items. It has remained a traditional craft of the Zapotecs and Mixtecs of the Central Valleys area to the present day. Originally all barro negro pottery was matte and grayish due to the qualities of the clay and the firing process. In this form, the pottery is very sturdy, allowing it to be hit without breaking. The barro negro pottery of Doña Rosa’s hometown of San Bartolo has been traditionally used to make large “cántaros”, tall vessels used for storing and transporting liquids, including mezcal.

In the 1950s, Doña Rosa discovered that she could change the color and shine of the pieces by making some changes to how the clay piece is handled. Just before the formed clay piece is completely dry, it is polished with a quartz stone to compress the surface. It is then fired at a slightly lower temperature than traditional pieces. After firing, the piece emerges a shiny black instead of a dull gray. This innovation makes the pieces more breakable, but it has made the pottery far more popular with Mexican folk art collectors, which included Nelson Rockefeller, who promoted it in the United States. The popularity stems from the look, rather than durability, so many pieces such as containers, whistles, flutes, bells, masks, lamps and animal figures are produced now for decorative purposes rather than utilitarian.

Doña Rosa died in 1980, but the tradition of making the barro negro pottery is being carried on by Doña Rosa’s daughter and grandchildren who stage demonstrations for tourists. The workshop is still in the family home, where shelves and shelves of shiny black pieces for sale line the inner courtyard. Despite being the origin of black polished clay, the pieces at the Doña Rosa Workshop are less expensive than in other parts of Mexico.
