= Emilio Molinero Hurtado =

Mexican potter

Emilio Molinero Hurtado (April 1920 – October 10, 2013) was a Mexican potter, noted for his revival of pre-Hispanic pottery designs.

Molinro Hurtado was raised in Tzintzuntzan, Michoacán and began working in clay with his father at age seven, making vessels for the storage of water and nixtamal, or corn for tortillas.

When his parents died, he decided to farm for a while. After he married his wife, Juana Huipi, he returned to pottery, beginning a career making pieces noted for their quality and design.

His designs are based on the remains of pre-Hispanic pottery he found in the fields, but are modified to be more contemporary. He worked with local clays, mostly reds, and whites, using both molds and his hands to shape pieces. The pieces were then burnished and painted, generally with pre-Hispanic style designs, white on burnt orange.

His work has won various awards in Michoacán, such as two from the Domingo de Ramos event in Uruapan, four from the Feria de Mayo in Morelia, and various from the Feria de Noche de Muertos in Tzintzuntzan. He was named a Great Master of Popular art by the Fomento Cultural Banamex in 2001, and in 2007 he received the Premio Estatal de las Artes Eréndira Prize from the state of Michoacán. He died October 10, 2013, at the age of 93.
