= José García Antonio =

José García Antonio (born August 10, 1947) is a Mexican potter from San Antonio Castillo Velasco in the municipality of Ocotlán, Oaxaca, a town noted for its handcrafts. He still has is house and workshop there, located beyond the church behind a tall gate that hides what is inside.

At the age of seven, he began making horses and giraffes from clay without any teacher to guide him, impressing others with his talent. His first commercial pieces were incense burners for Day of the Dead, adorning them with figures related to this holiday. His work has since become well known and was recognized as a “grand master” by the Fomento Cultural Banamex in 2001.

García Antonio is best known for her large-scale works, especially those of mermaids, which are covered in decorative elements and generally accompanied by a sun, moon and/or stars. He also creates robust female images dressed in traditional clothing and with facial features of Zapotec women and women from the Tehuantepec region of Oaxaca. Many of these are based on this own wife, and even include her beauty mark.

The artisan also makes more traditional items such as flower pots, nativity scenes, animal figures, angels, humorous skeletal figures for Day of the Dead and toys and decorations for Christmas.

García Antonio has been blind for 18 years from glaucoma, but he is still able to create his works by feel. He has no plans to quit despite his health problems. He works with local clay, making his pieces with molds and/or by hand. For large pieces, several techniques are used including molding and modeling, along adding decorative elements through carving and superimposed clay. Pieces are burnished with a smooth stone, the dried and fired. His pieces are left in their natural terra cotta color and range from the small to nearly life-sized. His works are primarily decorative and can be found in gardens in his home state.

García Antonio works with his wife, Teresita Mendoza Reyna Sánchez, whom he married in 1987. Both their children have followed in their footsteps. José Miguel García Mendoza won the Friends of Oaxacan Folk Art’s 2008 young artists’ competition. His daughter, Sara Ernestina García Mendoza, won honorable mention in the same competition.
