= Villajuana family =

The Villajuana family are Mexican artisans specializing in hammocks from Euan, Tixkokob, Yucatán in southern Mexico. Their work has been recognized by being named “grand masters” by the Fomento Cultural Banamex.

Euan is noted for hammocks and its one of its main sources of income. Most people in this area sleep on beds only in the winter. While most hammocks in the world are made industrially, some are still made by hand. The latter are made with henequen or sisal, which used to be highly in demand for making rope.

The family’s production focuses on Elena Manzano de Villajuana and her daughters and daughters-in-law. All began this work as children and the males in the family help as well. They are noted for making hammocks so large that they resemble fishing nets. They envelope the occupant completely, including those meant for two people. They netting is light to let air pass but close enough to act as a mosquito net. They made hammocks of both sisal and industrial cotton thread. The most traditional are made of sisal, a type of agave. The process of creating fiber from the agave leaves is called “corchado” and has its origins in the pre Hispanic period. It is difficult work but it results in fine and study products.

Elena learned to create the sisal fiber the traditional way, but her husband invented a kind of spinning wheel to create the fiber based on a bicycle wheel, which the family still uses. Creating the fiber is generally done early in the morning or in the evening when the fiber is the moistest.

The weaving of the hammocks is done on special wooden frames, and created by making a series of knots at regular intervals. When the center area is finished, the two ends are gathered, to allow it to be hung. They use natural dyes to create a variety of colors and patterns. These include traditional ones as well as some of their own invention.
