= Guillermo Ríos Alcalá =

Mexican potter, restoration expert and educator

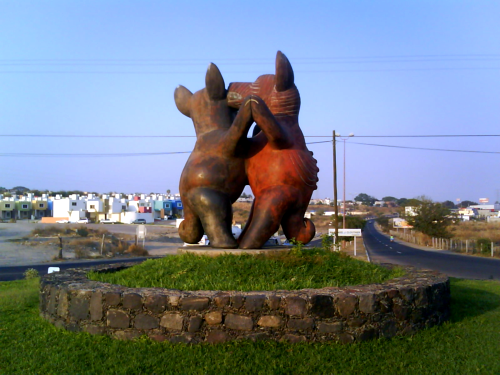
Dog sculpture in the city of Colima by the artisan

Guillermo Ríos Alcalá is a Mexican potter, restoration expert and educator from the state of Colima.

He was born in Chapala, Jalisco to Felipe Ríos and María Guadalupe Alcalá, but moved to the city of Colima in 1957. His grandfather, Jesús Becerra, was a potter, making pieces for personal use only. As a child, Ríos Alcalá played with balls of clay but had no real inclination towards pottery, but his father made him learn. His father was a farmer, who found pre Hispanic pieces while working in the fields. The artisan experimented with the broken ones, developing ways to restore them.

This became a vocation by accident. He was working as a bricklayer, and was asked to restore a pre Hispanic piece. This led to work with the University of Colima on restoration projects when he was only eighteen. Since then, he has established a permanent workshop at the Museo Universitario de Artes Populares María Teresa Pomar at the university, restoring pieces, making reproductions and giving workshops on pre Hispanic ceramics.

His restoration specialty are figures from the shaft tombs found in western Mexico. Most of his reproduction work is that of Colima area pre Hispanic pottery. He makes figures of birds, priests and men and women in various activities, as well as monkey figures found only in Colima, but his most popular works are those of xoloitzcuintles or Mexican hairless dogs. The most famous Mesoamerican era image of these dogs is falsely called “the dancing dogs” but in reality is a depiction of an older dog passing on generational information to the younger. Ríos Alcalá created a monumental version of this piece which stands at a traffic circle in the city of Colima, on the highway to Comala.

Ríos Alcalá has studied the pre Hispanic pottery of western Mexico for years, visiting pieces in museums and photographing archeological sites. He has continued working with the University of Colima, creating his reproductions with clay from Comala, using red earth pigments and creating pieces using molds. Several of his pieces are part of the museum's permanent collection.

His production is in demand by private collectors both in Mexico and abroad and he sometimes received special commissions. His work has brought him to countries such as the United States, Canada and Cuba to give talks and exhibitions. In 2006, an exhibition of his work was held at the Galería Marianao in Havana, sponsored by the Casa de las Américas and the Jornada de la Cultura Mexicana in Cuba.

He is married with seven children, but none are potters.

Ríos Alcalá has received recognition for his work since 1966 in the way of prizes and diplomas. He was named a “Great Master of Popular Art” by the Fomento Cultural Banamex in 2001. The Museo Universitario de Arte Popular Teresa Pomar held a retrospective of his work in 2010.
