= Andrés Uc Dzul =

Andrés Uc Dzul (1910–2004) was a Mexican artisan specializing in the creation of palm hats, especially Panama hats. His work was in great demand in the first half of the 20th century, and he was later recognized as a “grand master”.

Uc Dzul was born in Becal, Campeche, in southeast Mexico shortly after the start of the Mexican Revolution. He began making palm frond hats in his youth, becoming known for the “Panama hat”, obtaining the name from exports to Panama. This hat reached its height in the 1930s and 1940s, and can be seen on movie stars of that era. Because of the quality of his work, his hats became highly sought after during these decades, when he began working on his own, exported to the United States and Europe.

The hats are made from a type of palm leaf called jipi, named after the town of Jipijapa, Ecuador, which makes a similar hat. The palm leaves are cut while young and unopened to obtain the finest fiber. To prepare the fiber, the leaves are opened and dried in the sun, then bleached using sulfur. It is important to work the fiber while moist so that it does not break with the manipulation. During the rainy season, the work is done outdoors but during the dry season, artisans have special humidified rooms, caves and basements for this purpose. The weaving begins in the center of the top of the head and ends at the brim.

Uc Dzul retired after thirty-six years of making hats, but not before passing on the skill to his wife Patricia and his five children. The tradition continues with his grandchildren, especially Maleni, who has revived his technique using twenty threads in four parts. The family's workshop is at 148 Calle 30 in Tepakan, Becal, Campeche. They also make earrings, necklaces, change purses, cigarette holders and other things they call "curiosities", which allows the family to make sales to those without the means to buy the hats, which can sell today from between $90 and $200 (USD) in New York City.

Uc Dzul also founded the Taller de Artesanías in Becal, an artisans’ association with over eighty members.

== Awards ==
The artisan's work won first prize in the Campeche State Fair, which began in 1936, winning with various types of woven hats (Panama, Tejano, Charro, Calado, Yucateco and others) over various years. In 2003, he was named a “grand master” by the Fomento Cultural Banamex.
