= Ignacio Peralta Soledad =

Ignacio Peralta Soledad is a Mexican potter from Huaquechula, Puebla, known for his brightly colored ceramic sculptures which have been used to decorate homes, churches and plazas in various locations in Mexico.

His works include elements such as plants, flowers, birds, Virgin Mary images, saints, angels and archangels scattered among branches, similar to those of Trees of Life. Many of these also function as incense burners and candelabras.

Peralta Soledad uses clay, enamel paints, adhesive and commercial decorations to create his pieces. The clay is modeled by hand, with the exception of faces and other small details, which are created with molds. He produces his works only by special order or for certain holidays such as Day of the Dead and Christmas, generally creating pieces for these events about two months before.

Some of his creations can be found at the British Museum. In 2001, he was named a “grand master” by the Fomento Cultural Banamex.
