= Fortunato Moreno Reinoso =

Mexican fiber artist

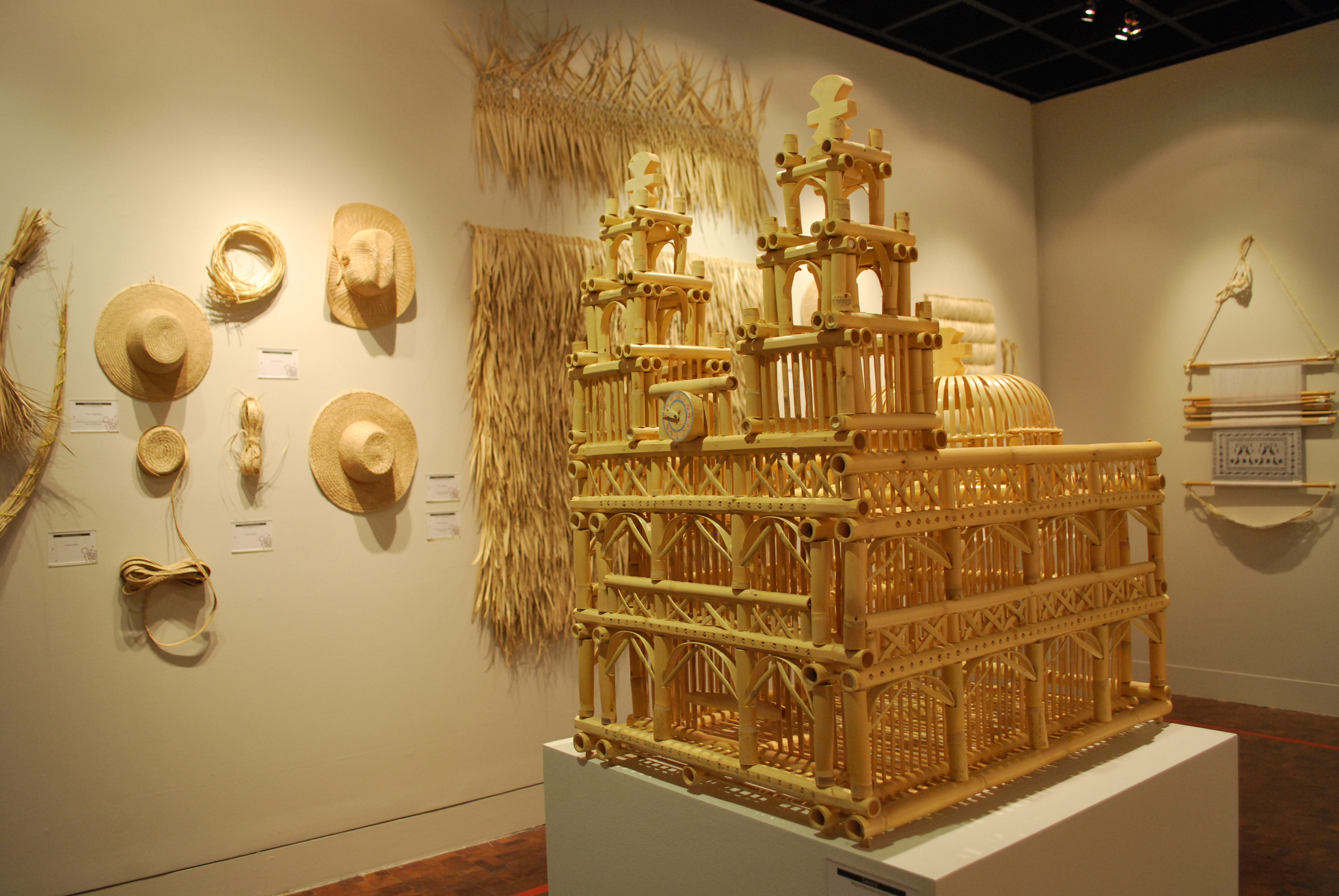
Cathedral-style bird cage made by the artisan's son, Miguel Moreno Jacinto on display at the Museo de Arte Popular

Fortunato Moreno Reinoso is a Mexican artisan from Ixmiquilpan, Hidalgo in central Mexico. He is noted for his work in reeds and bamboo, a tradition from the Otomi group to which he belongs, learning it from his father and grandfathers.

Moreno Reinoso makes large, ornate bird cages from the reeds and bamboo often in the forms of churches and houses, as well as boxes for paper, laundry baskets, book shelves and other light furniture.

He grows his own raw materials, and his house is filled with reeds and bamboo of various types along with machetes, knives, blades, chisels and pieces of leather.

Once the materials are cut, he and the family prepare it though a process of selection and cleaning, generally splitting the reeds and bamboo in two or more lengths. Then they are soaked for over twelve hours and left covered to maintain moisture. Standing at his worktable, he pulls the needed pieces. Thicker ones are used for support, sometimes with cross pieces for larger works. He usually leaves the finished product unpainted but sometimes adds brown blotches by lightly burning certain areas.

He has won various recognitions and awards for his work, including being named a “grand master” by the Fomento Cultural Banamex.
