= Fortunato Hernández Bazán =

Fortunato Hernández Bazán is a Mexican artisan from San Pedro Cajonos, Oaxaca in southern Mexico, who specializes in items made from ixtle fiber. He has been recognized as a “grand master” by the Fomento Cultural Banamex for his work .

Ixtle is obtained from the thick hard leaves of the maguey plant, which the artisan uses the fiber to make hammocks, nets, plant hangers, huaraches, bags and belts. He also works with a much finer maguey fiber called “pita,” which is obtained from the heart of the plant.

He learned the craft when he was a child and today, he works with his wife, Esperanza Cruz and his children, who participate in all phases of production in the family workshop.

He cuts the maguey leaves at the thickest part, near the base of the plant. To obtain the fiber, he cooks the leaves in a pit oven. When ready, he removes them and beats them to a pulp, loosening the fibers by scraping them free. The fibers are then placed in soapy water with lime to clean them. The cleaned fibers are straightened and set out to dry, then they are twisted into string. To color them, the string is put in a mixture of soapy water and dye.

Hammocks and nets are made in a similar fashion, by knotting on a rudimentary wooden frame. The knotting techniques are traditional to the region, with variations called jaspeado, el arroz, el arroz fino and crucetas. The method of finishing off hammocks and making the loops to hang them is unique to the artisan's community.
