= Plácido Otilia family =

The Plácido Otilia family is a Mexican family which specializes in the making of traditional musical instruments for the Huapango music of the La Huasteca region.(grandes) The family lives in Texquitote, Matlapa, San Luis Potosí and headed by patriarch Eustacio Plácido Otilia, an ethnic Nahua.

The family produces mostly string instruments such as violins, jaranas, tiny guitars called mosquitos, ravelitos and quintas, known for the quality of the sound. They are particularly known for their charangos, a guitar like instrument backed by an armadillo shell.

Eustacio Plácido Otilia learned the craft from his father and has continued the tradition, teaching generations of his family as well as others in the community, giving classes at the local Juan Sarabia School.

The family prefer to work with fine woods such as cedar, palo escrito and palo de rosa, matching the size of the raw wood to that of the finished product, in order to get the best sound.

The family was named as “grand masters” by the Fomento Cultural Banamex in the 2000s. In 2010, Eustacio placed third in musical instruments at the XXXV Edición Gran Premio Nacional de Arte Popular Bicentenario 2010 sponsored by FONART and third in the same category at the Gran Premio de Arte Popular 2010 sponsored by SEDESOL and others. The latter award was for a “teponaxtle” a pre Hispanic instrument used during droughts to call rain in the San Luis Potosí part of the Huasteca region.
