= Cayetano Corona Gaspariano =

Mexican potter

Cayetano Corona Gaspariano is a Mexican potter from San Pablo del Monte, Tlaxcala, who is the only authenticated producer of Talavera ceramics in the state.

He left his home state at age thirteen to learn the craft in Puebla, working for years at the Uriarte workshop. In 1981, he decided to return to San Pablo del Monte, founding his own workshop with his sons. This eventually grew into the current La Corona enterprise.

The workshop produces bowls, large covered vases called tibores, flowerpots, jars, platters, and tiles. They make some tiles that assemble into murals with country scenes and religious imagery. They use two types of clay, a black sandy type and a rose-colored clay, both bought in bulk in Puebla. They blend the clays and leave them wet to ferment before shaping pieces, usually with molds. The pieces sit to dry in an unventilated room, which can take up to a month. The unglazed pieces are fired, then coated in a white glaze made from tin and lead. They paint designs with mineral pigments limited to the traditional colors of Talavera ceramics: blue, yellow, red, green, black and white.

Because of its certification, the Corona family can sell its ware in upscale markets in Mexico such as Liverpool. They also export to Canada, the United States, Denmark and Japan.

In 2001, Corona Gaspariano was named a “grand master” by the Fomento Cultural Banamex . La Corona and other workshops run by the family received a visit from the state governor in 2012.
