= Maximo Gómez Ponce =

Maximo Gómez Ponce is a noted Mexican potter from the La Luz neighborhood of the city of Puebla, an area known for its local traditional pottery.

He is the third generation of artisans in his family, learning it from his father who had learned it from his own father. The tradition has been passed since to his nephew to carry on the family tradition.

Gómez Ponce creates a number of utilitarian items such as tortilla warmers, containers for mole, jars, and cooking vessels such as pots and a large flat bottomed piece called an arrocera, used for making rice or paella. He also makes miniatures and ritual items such as incense burners, candle holders and items for Day of the Dead altars.

Gómez Ponce uses various molds he has created himself for many of the pieces although for larger pots he uses a turntable. This requires skill because the sides of the pots must be uniform to prevent cracking. After forming and drying, pieces are painted, glazed then fired in a brick kiln.

In 2001, Gómez Ponce was listed as a "great master" by the Fomento Cultural Banamex.
