= María Quiñones Carrillo =

Mexican basket maker

María Quiñones Carrillo is a Mexican basket maker, who has been named a “grand master” of Mexican handcrafts by the Fomento Cultural Banamex.

Quiñones Carrillo learned the craft from her mother growing up in Otovachi, Chihuahua in a basket making family. She has passed on her knowledge to her daughters as well as other interested young people.

She alternates this work with farm chores, working with plants she gathers from nearby, making baskets, tortilla holders and more to sell mostly in the local area.

Her most common raw material is a kind of palm leaf called sotol, but she also uses yucca leaves, séleke fiber and other palms. She carries out the entire process herself, from cutting the plants to producing the finished product, using only a knife. Most of her work follows traditional designs, although some include variations she has created.
