= Ángel Gil =

Mexican artisan

Ángel Gil is a Mexican artisan who specialized in creating items from ixtle fiber. He has been named a “grand master” of Mexican handcrafts by the Fomento Cultural Banamex.

Gil was born in Xichú, Guanajuato in central Mexico, an area known for its fiber arts, learning to make rope and carrying bags from his father. These items are made from ixtle, a fiber which is derived from the large, thick fronds of the maguey and similar plants. He prefers to prepare the fiber himself. He cuts the frond then covers them in water with lime, leaving them soak for a week underground. After this, the fronds are beaten with a wooden mallet over a smooth stone then frees the underlying fiber from the pulp. The fiber is then washed in soapy water and laid out to dry in the sun. He spins the fiber into string using a malacate, a simple large needle that spins in a cup, all controlled by hand.

He specializes in the making of a very strong rope and various types of carrying bags decorated with country scenes. The latter are woven on a backstrap loom.
