= María de Jesús Nolasco Elías =

Mexican potter (1944–2000)

María de Jesús Nolasco Elías (December 8, 1944 – d. 2000) was a Mexican potter from Ocumicho, Michoacán, a town noted for the creation of colorful ceramic figurines.

She learned the craft from another Ocumicho potter named Marcelino Vicente.

Her works show imagination, for example the creation of devils emerging from flames, animals devouring each other, images from the life of Christ with indigenous elements and even a representation of the Last Supper, with Jesus eating a watermelon. She also created mermaids, smiling sun faces, portraits of real people and trees of life.

Nolasco Elías's pieces were both made with molds and by hand, using local clays, polishing dried pieces with a stone.

Her work was shown at the Museo de Arte Moderno in Mexico City in 1993, as well as at various exhibitions outside Mexico. She was named a "grand master" by the Fomento Cultural Banamex in 2001.
