= Felipa Tzeek Naal =

Mexican artisan

Felipa Tzeek Naal is a Mexican artisan specializing in traditional Maya palm frond weaving. Her work is well-known regionally and has been recognized by the Fomento Cultural Banamex, who named her a "grand master".

She lives in Nunkini, a small village in the municipality of Calkiní Municipality, Campeche in the southeast of Mexico. Since before the Conquest, the Maya wove mats and baskets from the leaves of a local palm called "huano", with fretwork and geometric designs. The artisan and her daughter, María Olga Kantum Tzeek are the only ones left who still practice this craft, weaving fine pieces with traditional designs. Felipa learned these designs from her grandmother.

Frond collection is done by the entire family, cut while young and unopened to keep their shine. The leaves are then separated and left to dry, then they are bleached using sulfur. Many of the leaves are then dyed with plants such as "chackxin" traditionally in reds and ochre. Weaving is done with the hands only and no frames. Designs are woven into the pieces using two or more colors, and/or undyed fronds and can be intricate, forming various geometric forms.

Commonly made pieces include baskets of various sizes, carrying bags, toys, fans, and mats of various sizes. Large baskets have bases made with a studier palm leaf called chilib.
