= Ascensión de la Cruz Morales =

Ascensión de la Cruz Morales is a Mexican artisan from the small community of San Francisco Ocotán, Durango who specializes in making musical instruments such as violins, guitars, tolochoches(similar to a cello) and harps. His work has earned him the title of “grand master” from the Fomento Cultural Banamex.

Although his family has a tradition of making musical instruments, the artisan learned his craft in Tuxpan, Nayarit where he spent part of his life.

The instruments are made from local woods called guásina, palo blanco, willow and palo chino woods. The work requires patience as an instrument such as the tolochoche can take up to twelve days. Wood must be planed and various pieces curved around molds. The pieces are glued together and the instrument sanded and varnished.

The instruments are often played at mitotes, a type of traditional festival of the Tepehuanos.
