= Esther Medina Hernández =

Mexican potter

Esther Medina Hernández is a Mexican potter, known for her barrel cactus shaped wares.

Medina Hernández is from a small town called Los Reyes Mezontala, Puebla, which has been a pottery-making community since its founding. It is a Mixtec community near the Cerro Coronillas mountain which provides black and reddish clay. She learned the trade from her parents, making pots, comals, storage containers and other utilitarian items. She currently works with her family to make many of these same pieces, but has become known for a particular style of storage jar of her invention, called a “biznaga” or barrel cactus. This is the most popular piece, created in the shape of this plant, including the corrugated sides, all shaped by hand. The pieces are shaped and dried, the piece is burnished with a gourd shell and some receive a coating of white or one of a rust color. Then it is polished again so that it shines after firing. The larger pieces can be dyed in a boiling bath using plants such as cuaxiote or palo mulato. Firing is done above ground with the pots covered in wood another fuel which is set alight.
