= Esther Hernandez (artist) =

Esther Hernandez is a performance and installation artist based in Denver, Colorado.
