= Santa Fe International Folk Art Market =

Art market in Santa Fe, New Mexico, USA

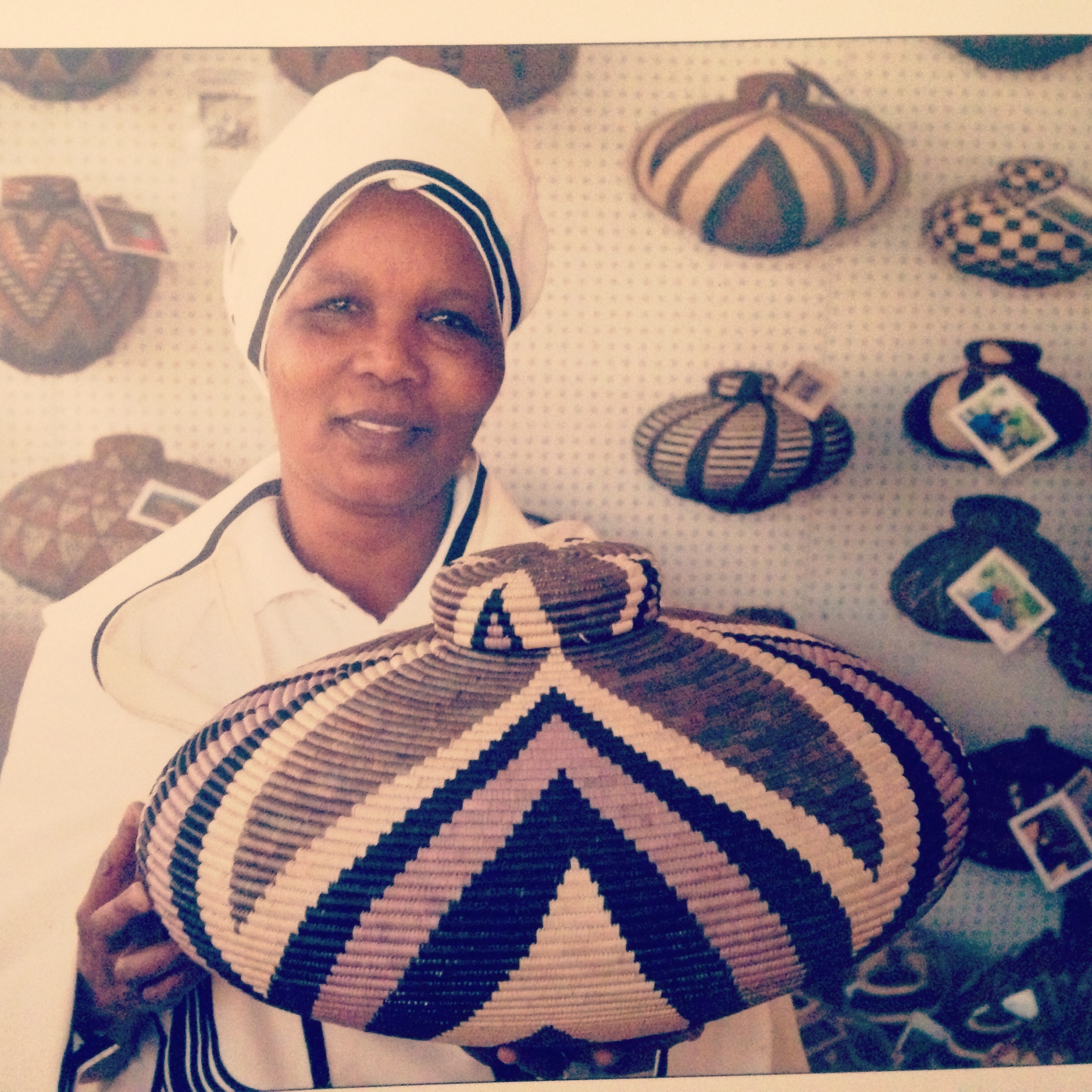
- Beauty Ngxongo at the 2011 IFAM
- Status: active
- Frequency: annual
- Venue: Milner Plaza
- Location: Santa Fe, New Mexico
- Coordinates: 35.68°N 105.95°W
- Country: United States
- Established: July 2004
- Founders: Thomas Aageson, Charmay Allred, Charlene Cerny, Judith Espinar
- Previous event: July 2025
- Next event: July 2026
- Sponsors: UNESCO
- Website: folkartmarket.org

Started in 2004, the annual International Folk Art Market (sometimes with "Santa Fe" in the name to distinguish from other markets) is held during one weekend of July on Milner Plaza in Santa Fe, New Mexico. The Folk Art Market is one of three summer markets in Santa Fe; Santa Fe also hosts the Spanish Market and the Indian Market.

== History ==
The Market was founded by businesswoman Judith Espinar, together with Thomas Aageson, executive director of the Museum of New Mexico Foundation and former executive director of Aid to Artisans; the former Market executive director, Charlene Cerny, formerly director of the Museum of International Folk Art in Santa Fe, and Charmay Allred, a community philanthropist. The State of New Mexico Department of Cultural Affairs, the Museum of International Folk Art, and the Museum of New Mexico Foundation are the primary strategic partners. In its inaugural year, the market hosted sixty participating folk artists. By 2008, the number of artists had grown to 125 artists from 41 countries and in 2009, 126 artists from 46 nations.

UNESCO (United Nations Educational, Scientific, and Cultural Organization) was an early sponsor, providing funding for ten artists, followed by an artist-training program in 22 countries. UNESCO has given its Award of Excellence to several products beginning in 2007. In 2009, three booths featured UNESCO award-winning work. In 2008, 97% of the market artists were from developing countries in Africa, Asia, Latin America, Central Asia, and the Middle East.

The Market supported an initiative to train cultural entrepreneurs in Africa through the W.K. Kellogg Intern Program. The program funded four arts professionals from Africa, to prepare the interns to develop folk art markets in their home countries. In 2008, the arts professionals in this program were: Mahaliah Kowa, former Project Coordinator of the Harambe Afrika! Festival in Johannesburg; Chila Smith Lino, Marketing Director of the non-profit Nacional de Artesanato in Mozambique; Nomvula Moshoai-Cook, Chairperson for the Mpumulanga Traditional Arts Festival in South Africa; and Jane Parsons, Crafts Consultant for the Harare International Festival of the Arts in Zimbabwe.

=== Clinton Global Initiative ===
Former President Bill Clinton had commissioned three market artists to create prizes that were presented in September 2009 to the winners of the Clinton Global Citizen Awards — which honored individuals and organizations for their philanthropic contributions to global welfare. The work of the three artists, Serge Jolimeau and Michee Remy of Haiti and Toyin Folorunso of Nigeria, represented recycled metals.

=== Market 2012 ===
In July 2012, the ninth year of the Market, 156 artists participated from 54 different countries across 6 continents; 4 new countries were represented including Colombia, Hungary, South Sudan, South Korea, and Vanuatu. 58 artists were from cooperatives and NGOs that represent approximately 36,059 artisans — positively impacting the lives of over 360,000 extended family members. 19,536 people attended. Artists’ sales increased by 7% from the 2011 Market to $2.4 million in 2012. The average sales per booth amounted to $18,253. Artists retain 90% of their sales.
