= Cantaro =

Percussion instrument

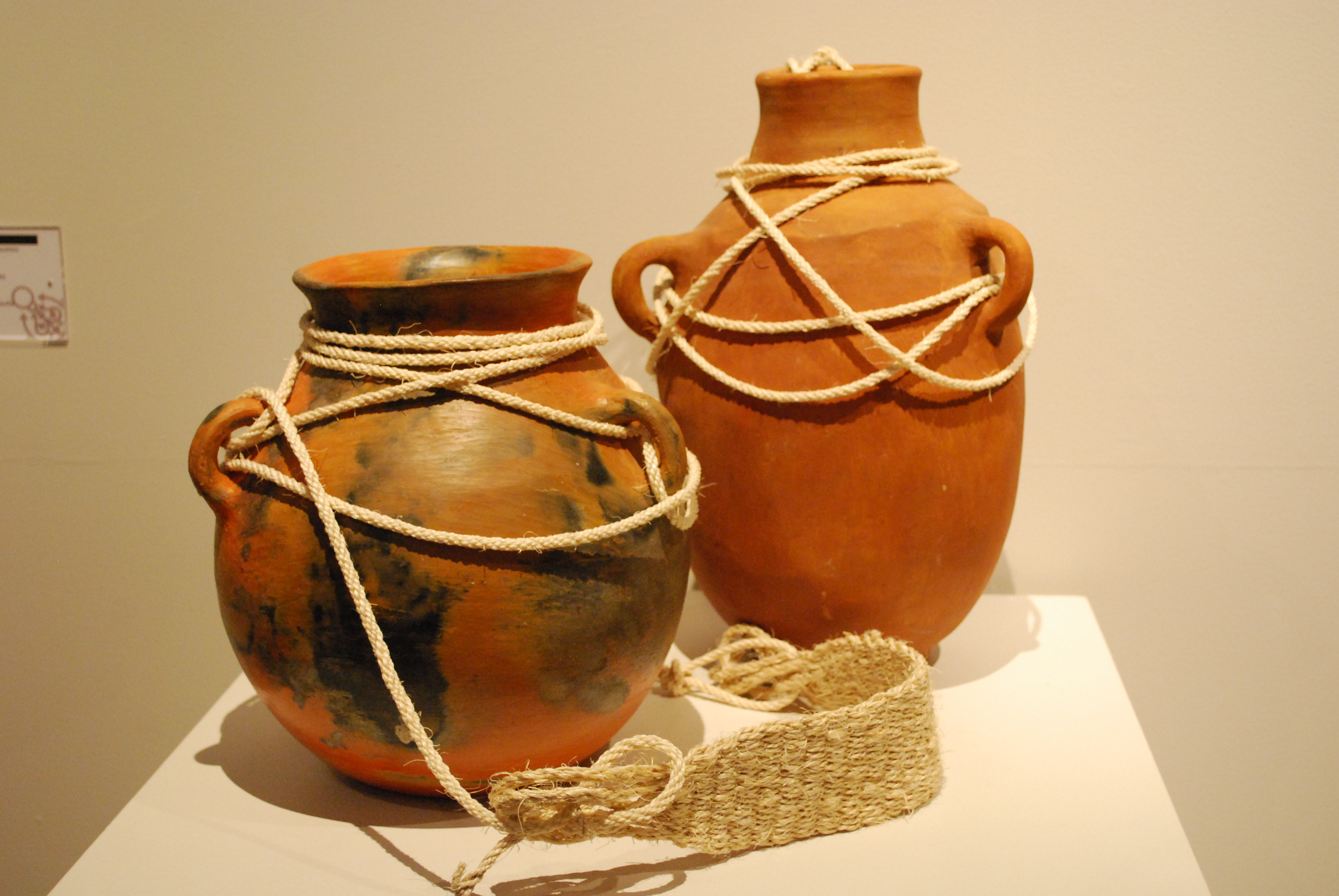
Cantaro

The cantaro is a percussion instrument. It is a clay pot that is struck in its outer surface or mouth with a hand, creating different effects. Water can be used to pitch the instrument to a desired sound.

In Mexico, particularly in the states of Guerrero and Oaxaca, it is used to accompany chilenas, sones, parabienes, gustos, minuetes, jarabes oaxaqueños, and indigenous dances. The cantaro is also used in the fandangos mixtecos of Puebla.

== See also ==
- Udu, a similar musical pot found in Africa
