= National Fund for the Development of Arts and Crafts =

Fund supporting arts and crafts development

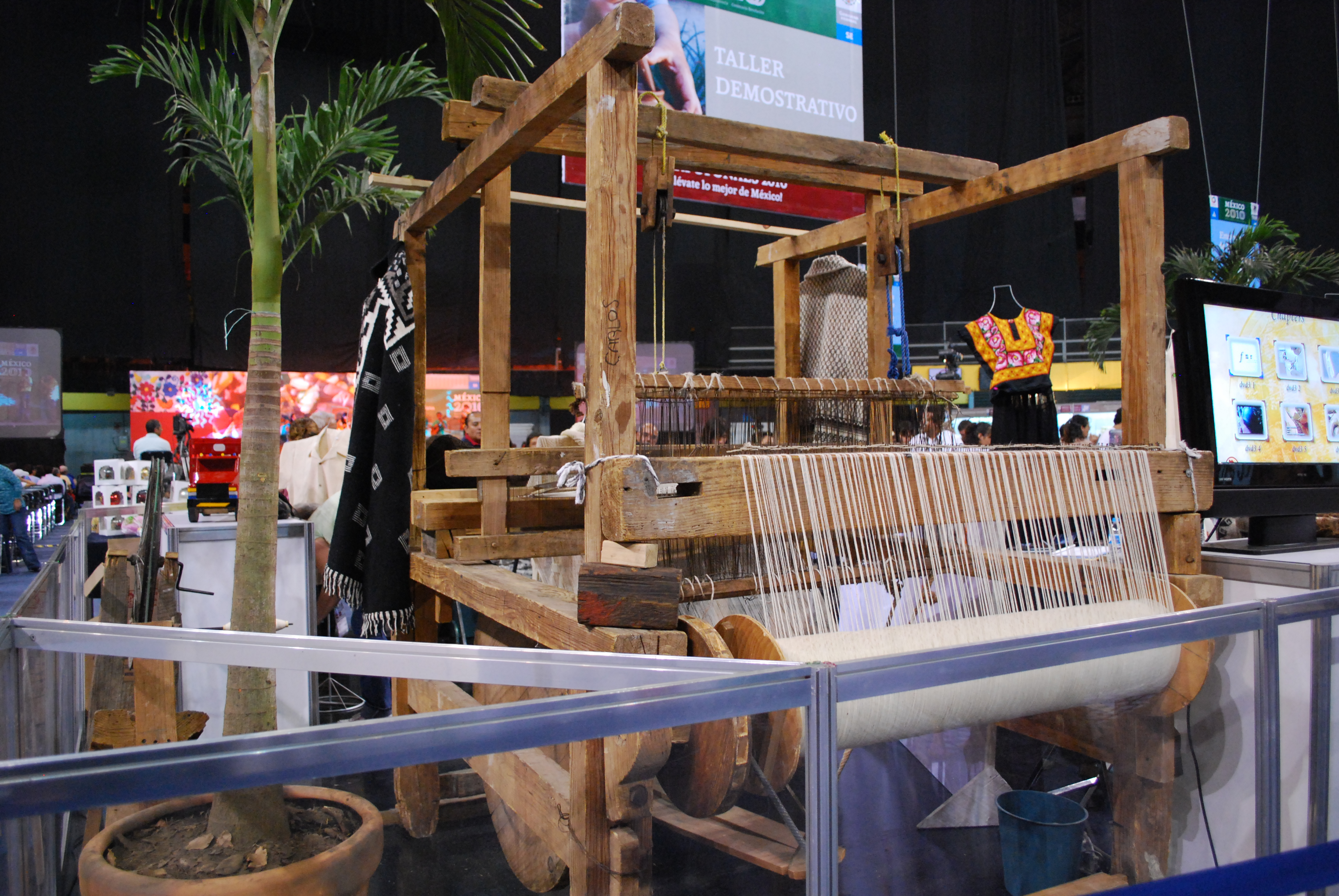
Loom on display at the Palacio de Deportes for the annual FONART craft exhibition

The Fondo Nacional para el Fomento de las Artesanías or National Fund for the Development of Arts and Crafts (best known as FONART) is a dependence of the Secretariat of Social Development (SEDESOL). It was established in 1974 to promote and protect traditional Mexican handcrafts. The agency has four main programs including artisan training, retail selling and the sponsoring of craft competitions as the local, regional and national level. FONART directly helped 26,600 artisans in 2006, but the agency has been criticized for being inefficient and not meeting the demands of national transparency laws. Currently, it seeks the capacity to authenticate crafts on a national and international level due to competitions from imitations from Asia.

== Purpose ==
FONART was founded in 1974 and since 1995, it has been under the supervision of the Secretariat of Social Development (SEDESOL). The overall purpose is to protect and promote traditional Mexican handcrafts, opening national and international markets for craftsmen as many of these workers live on poor, rural and indigenous areas. There are an estimated 8 million artisans working in Mexico, and FONART directly helped 26,600 of them in 2006. Those who live in impoverished or indigenous areas have priority. In 2007, the agency had a 71 million peso budget, 42 million pesos of which were generated by sales of crafts.

== Main programs ==
FONART has four different programs to promote and benefit Mexican handcrafts. These involving artisan training, technical assistance, financing, craft competitions and a government buying program.

Training is offered to help artisans improve the quality and design of their products, while maintaining traditional cultural elements as well as making production techniques more environmentally friendly. Grants are awarded to qualified individuals or organized groups mostly as an alternative to traditional banking. Annual regional competitions to honor artisans who have excelled in their craft, as well at those who stand out in areas such as innovation and the preservation and rescue of traditional techniques. Competitions are held at the local, state and national levels. Winning pieces are then considered to be high-value items.

FONART also has a buying program where pieces are purchased directly from artisans at regional centers or through agents that travel to crafts areas periodically. FONART also buys pieces from different state-run institutions that promote crafts. The acquisition system has five storage centers located in the states of Jalisco, Michoacán, Oaxaca, San Luis Potosí and Mexico City.

== Craft competitions ==
FONART sponsors crafts competitions in various parts of the country to promote the sale and quality of crafts produced. This function is under the Departmento de Concursos headed by Raymundo Martínez. The purses for first prize offered at these events vary from 10,000 to 100,000 pesos. In the state of Guerrero alone, competitions include the Pintores de Alto Balsas (folk painting on amate paper) in Xalitla, the Concurso de Hilado y Tejido del Huipil (huipil) in Metlatónoc, the Concurso de Alfarería con Engobes Minerales (pottery) in San Agustín Oapan, the Concurso de Laca Artesanal (lacquered items) of Temalcatzingo, the Concurso Municipal de Joyería (jewelry), the Concurso Regional de la Costa Chica, the Concurso de Laca (lacquered items) in Olinalá and the Concurso Nacional de la Feria de la Plata (silverwork) in Taxco. The last is a national level competition. Pieces are judged on design, technique, materials used in its production and if the piece represents an ethnic culture of Mexico. Another factor is if the piece uses a sustainable resource.

== Retail stores ==
Fairs and markets are key outlets for Mexican crafts but they are not sufficient. The agency runs a number of retail stores, all of which are in Mexico City with the exception of one in San Luis Potosí. The best-selling items are ceramics, lacquered items and glasswork. Most products come from Oaxaca, Chiapas and Michoacan. In contrast to most other craft outlets, crafts at the FONART stores are more upscale and more varied. The FONART store reached sales of over 2.5 million pesos per year. However, one problem that FONART stores have had is that most are not placed in tourist venues. However, recently, the agency has begun to work with the federal Secretariat of Tourism in order to find more ways to sell to international tourists as well as use crafts as to attract tourists to rural areas.

== Annual FONART exhibition ==
FONART and other agencies sponsor a yearly exhibition and bazaar that travels around the country. In 2010, the theme was connection to the twin celebrations of the bicentennial of Mexico’s Independence and the Centennial of the Mexican Revolution. The offering of crafts by vendors at this event is quite varied with representatives from all Mexican states as well as the Federal District of Mexico City. In exhibition were 500 pieces deemed to be the most representative of Mexican crafts.

== Criticism ==
In the early 2000s, President Vicente Fox nearly shut down the agency, stating that it was not living up to goals, particularly in the selling of crafts purchased from artisans. More recently, FONART has been criticized for failing to conform sufficiently to federal transparency in information laws, including the lack of publication of mandatory information on its website.

== Efforts to protect Mexican crafts ==
Another effort by FONART concerns the protection of Mexican handcrafts from cheaper imports, especially those from China and other parts of Asia. FONART has asked the Congress of Mexico for the right to fine companies that import Asian imitations of Mexican crafts. Another proposal is to register regional and craft trademarks to ensure that genuine Mexican crafts are marked as such at the national and international level. Currently, thirty three crafts have this type of trademark at the state level. These include the crafts made in Oaxacan locales such as San Bartolo Coyotepec, Santo Tomás Jalieza, Teotitlán del Valle and San Martín Tilcajete.
