= Handcrafts and folk art in Oaxaca =

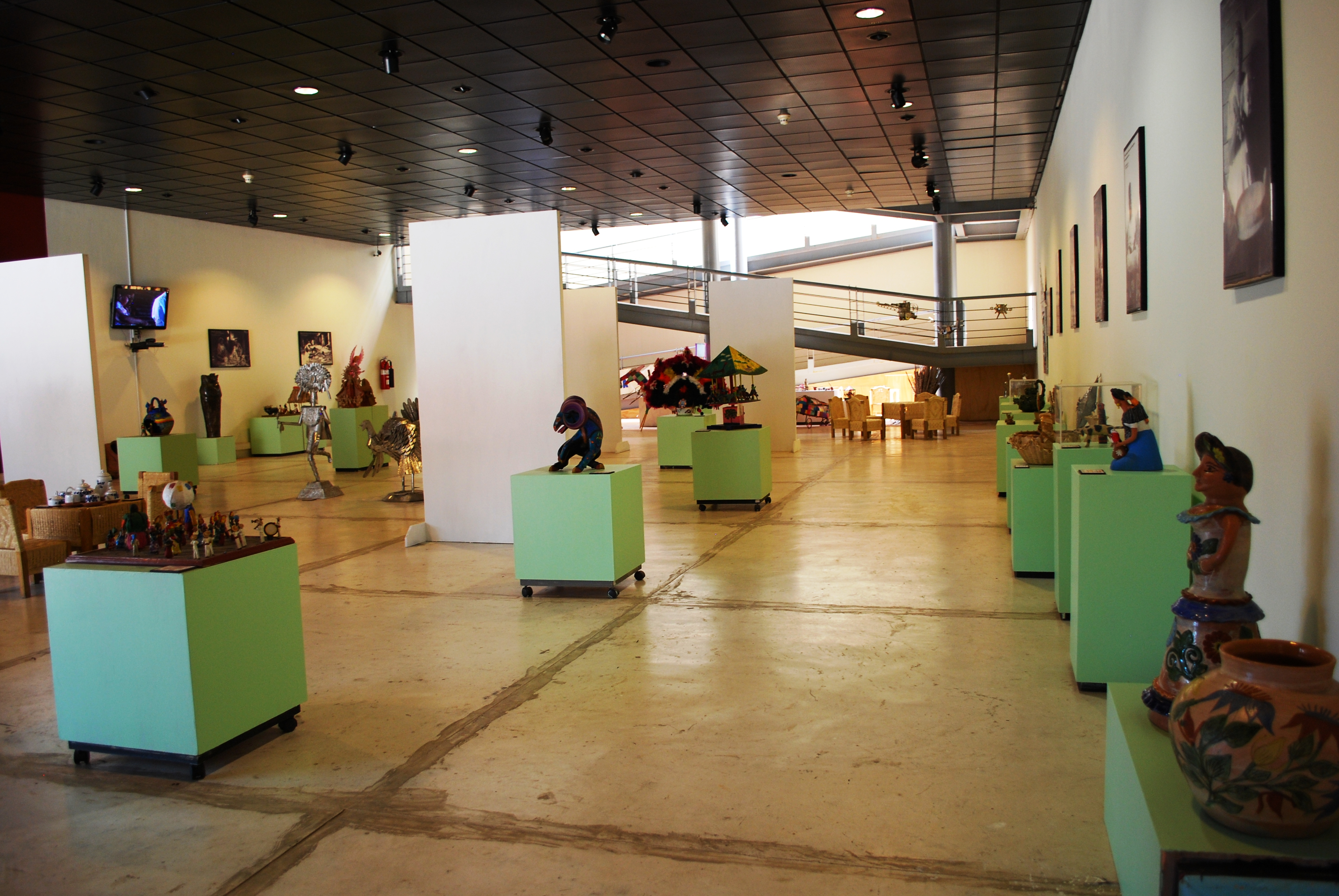
Exhibition hall from the Museo Estatal de Arte Popular de Oaxaca

Oaxaca handcrafts and folk art is one of Mexico's important regional traditions of its kind, distinguished by both its overall quality and variety. Producing goods for trade has been an important economic activity in the state, especially in the Central Valleys region since the pre-Hispanic era which the area laid on the trade route between central Mexico and Central America. In the colonial period, the Spanish introduced new raw materials, new techniques and products but the rise of industrially produced products lowered the demand for most handcrafts by the early 20th century. The introduction of highways in the middle part of the century brought tourism to the region and with it a new market for traditional handcrafts. Today, the state boasts the largest number of working artisans in Mexico, producing a wide range of products that continue to grow and evolve to meet changing tastes in the market.

Oaxacan handcrafts are also highly specialized by community. Notable wares include the barro negro pottery of San Bartolo Coyotepec, the green glazed and other pottery of Santa María Atzompa, the wool textiles of Teotitlán del Valle and surrounding communities, the mezcal of Tlacolula de Matamoros (and numerous other towns and villages) and a newcomer, colorful animal figures carved from wood made in San Antonio Arrazola and San Martín Tilcajete. Most of the production is in the Central Valleys, but artisans can be found all over the state including the Chinantla area with its huipils, the Tehuantepec area with its traditional clothing and jewelry made of gold coins and palm frond woven goods from the Mixtec area of the state.

== Status and distinguishing characteristics ==
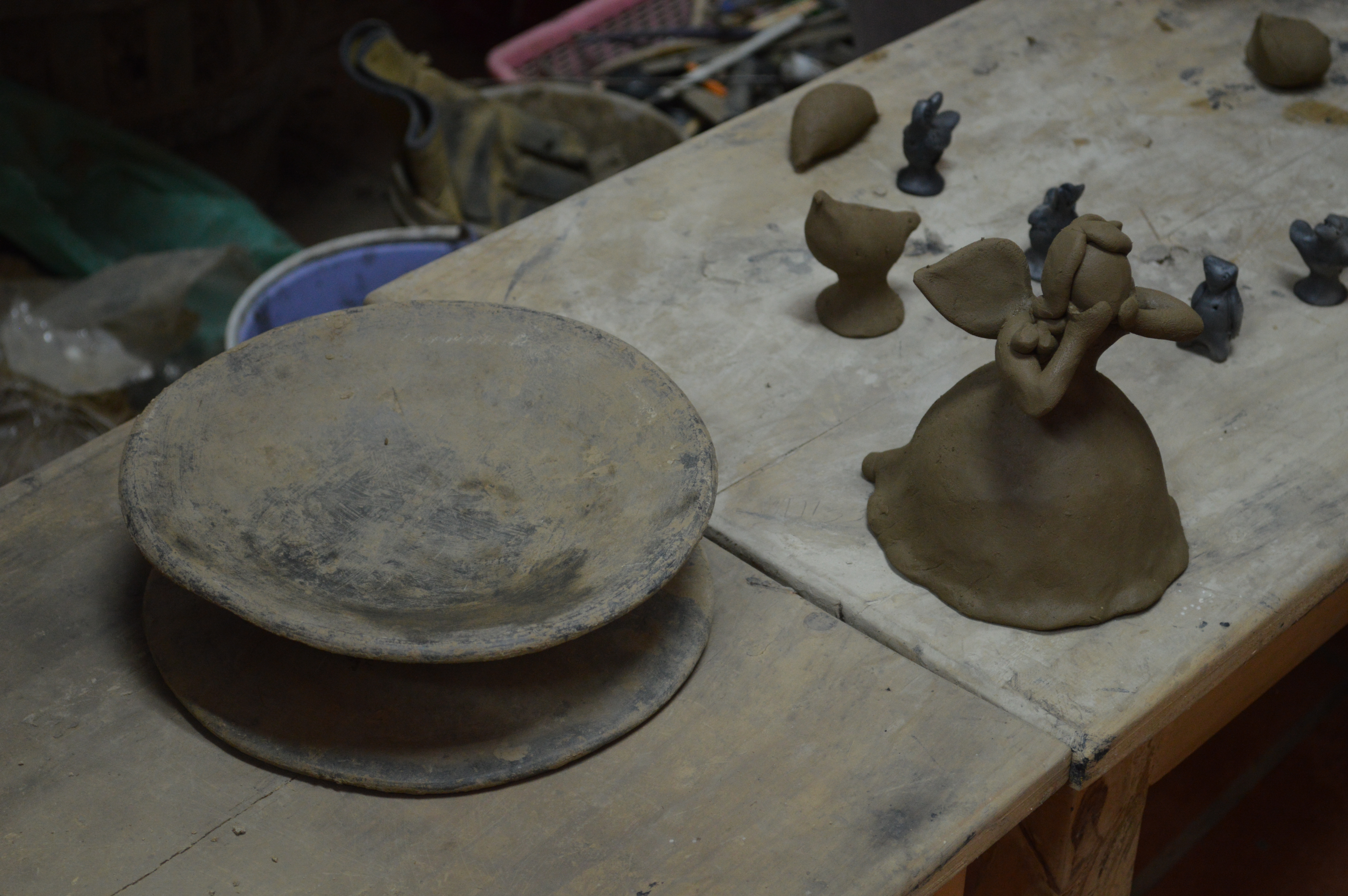
A "proto-turntable" and figure in progress from the Carlomagno Pedro Martínez workshop in San Bartolo Coyotepec

The state of Oaxaca is one of the main and best-known producers of handcrafts (which includes certain kinds of processed foods) in Mexico. Its long tradition of production since the pre-Hispanic period along with an abundance of raw materials has allowed this tradition to stand out both in quality and the variety. The most successful products are ceramics and textiles, followed by those made from wood and leather. Other production includes wood carving, metal work, embroidery, leatherwork, fireworks, papel picado, stone work, furniture and more.

One distinguishing feature of Oaxaca handcrafts is specialization of production by community, which began in the pre-Hispanic period supported by a complex web of regional markets. This tradition is maintained because of the state's mountainous terrain and poverty, which has inhibited the development of transportation infrastructure allowing communities to remain relatively autonomous and fractured politically and socially. This tradition is one of the strongest in Mexico, the number of artisan producers in Oaxaca was estimated at 451,837 artisans, equivalent to 12% of the state's total population (FONART, 2020). The regional market system also remains in place to make handcrafts widely available in the state, especially in the Central Valleys region.

The strongest indigenous influences on Oaxacan handcrafts are Zapotec and Mixtec. Local materials also have an effect on what is produced. In San Bartolo Coyotepec, the local clay turns a deep shiny black if the piece is burnished before firing. Traditional dyes for textiles include those made from the cochineal insect, which produces various shades of red and a marine snail found on the state's coastline for purple. Traditional fibers include cotton (brown and white), wool and maguey. Production techniques are largely unchanged since the pre Hispanic and colonial periods, made in family workshops, with labor often divided by sex, age and social status. A number of artisans and artisan families have gained reputation for fine products and the fine pieces can be found in museums in many parts of the world. There is also innovation in the handcraft markets with artisans adapting designs to suit new markets and even the creation of new items, such as alebrijes.

== Development ==
Elena Villaseñor Oviedo weaving a double-sided piece on a backstrap loom at the Feria Maestros del Arte

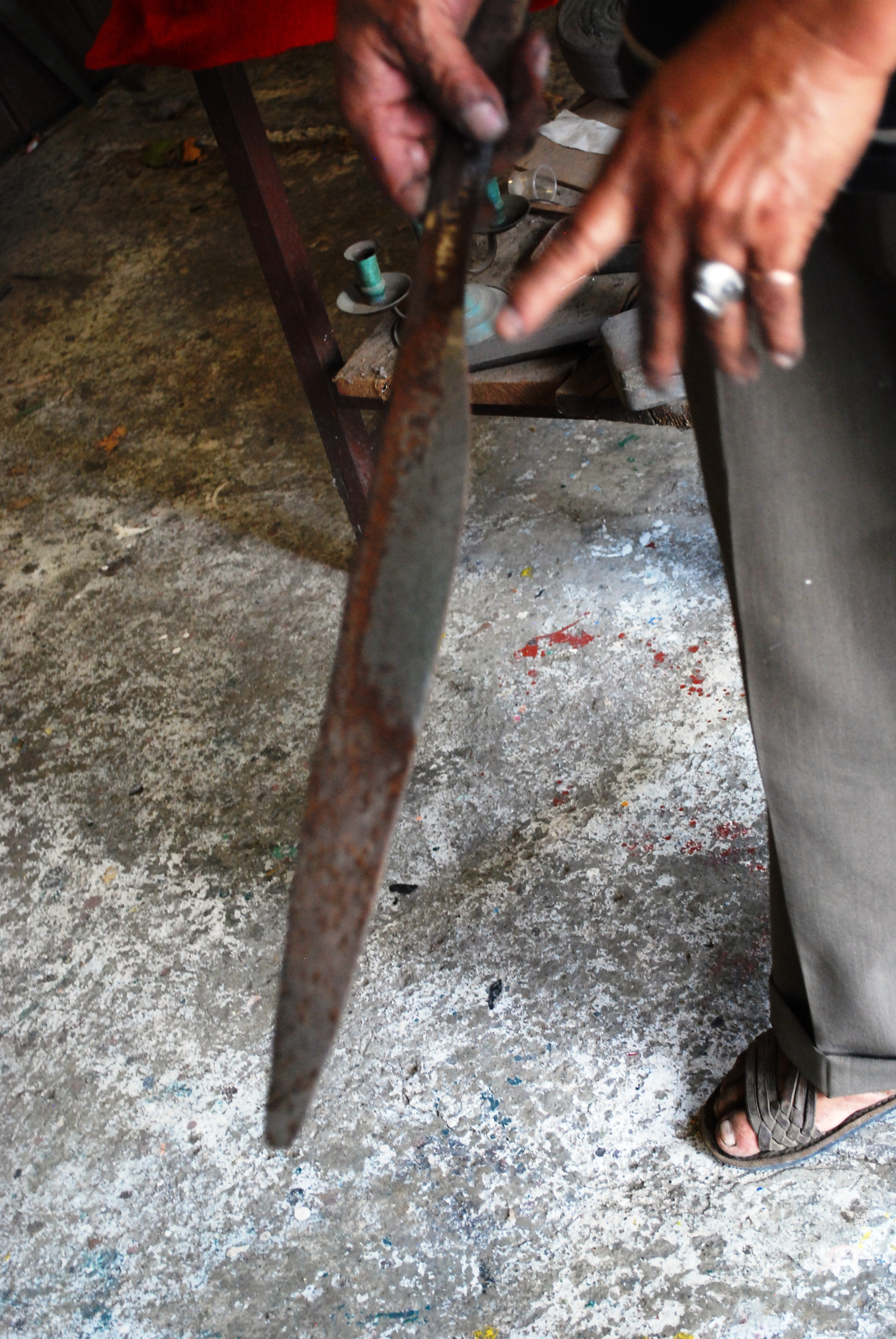
Blade in development at the Aguilar workshop in Ocotlán de Morelos

The making of good for trade as well as local use was established in the region relatively early in the pre-Hispanic period because the state, especially the Central Valley, was on the trade route that connected central Mexico with Central America. One example of this is the archeological site of El Palmillo, which was a major weaving center, with the weaving of various fibers established by the Classic Period. Then as now, production was centered in households with the households varying in the intensity and type of production. One other common trade good was worked seashells, which the raw material coming from the Oaxacan coast despite the rough terrain, to be worked and then traded here.

This tradition of supplementing family income has remained to the present day. The main products have been textiles, ceramics, stone products, baskets and wood products although these have evolved and new products have been introduced.

The Spanish, at the beginning of the colonial period, introduced new raw materials, new products and new techniques to diversify the products the region's artisans produced. In the pre-Hispanic period, the main fibers were cotton and ixtle (made from maguey leaves), and the main weaving mechanism was the backstrap loom. The Spanish introduced wool and silk, along with new dyes/colors as well as the pedal loom, which allows faster weaving and the creation of larger pieces. Today Oaxacan weavers produce rugs, handkerchiefs, carrying bags, ponchos, various articles of clothing and more. These changes did not eliminate the older methods. The backstrap loom in still in use, as are dyes made from local plants, animals and minerals such as cochineal, an insect which is used to create red and tishinda, a marine snail used to create purple. The Spanish also introduced glazed ceramics, the filigree method of making gold and silver jewelry and the working of new metals, especially tin and iron.

By the 20th century, industrialization had chipped away at the production of handcrafts, especially for local use. For example, by 1965 in San Miguel del Valle, only a few old men still weaved the local wood, using natural dyes because the demand was so low. However, in the 1960s and 1970s, the construction of modern roadways, especially the Pan American Highway, allowed the development of a tourist industry, catering to those looking to explore traditional Mexico as well as the coastline. The modern Oaxacan handcraft industry took off, with its initial market being tourists. This led to an interest in traditional methods with the numbers of artisans multiplying, especially in textiles and ceramics from the 1960s to the late 1980s. By the end of this period, a number of communities’ economies had changed from agricultural to those based on one particular handcraft. The 20th century also saw some changes in technique, especially the use of synthetic dyes and paints and commercial thread, as well as lead-free glazes, but these have not completely replaced more traditional production.

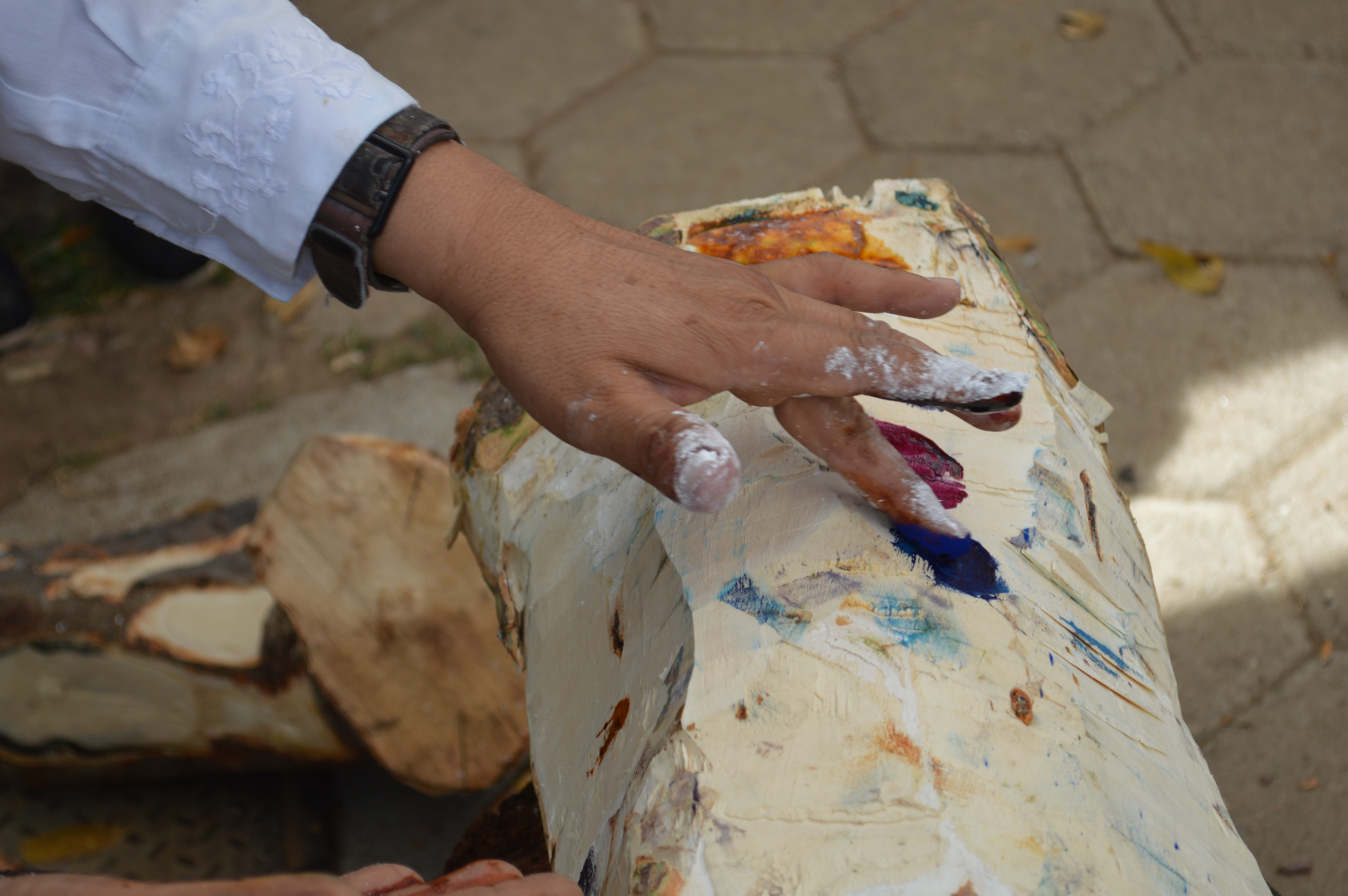
Jacobo Angeles demonstrates the making of paints with natural pigments in his workshop in San Martín Tilcajete

Today, Oaxacan handcrafts are heavily dependent on the tourist trade, including collectors who come to the area especially for handcrafts. This success has also translated into an increase in exports of products to various parts of the world, especially to the United States. The continued development of Oaxacan crafts is supported by both government and private entities. One method of doing this is to encourage younger generations to become craftsmen, with money for equipment and avenues to promote their merchandise such as contests. These efforts also include those outside of Mexico, such as a government-run outlet in Pasadena, California, financing for export by Bancomext and sales by groups such as the Friends of Oaxacan Folk Art. Handcraft traditions continue to evolve in the state, generally to cater to tourist and foreign tastes and include the creation of new products such as alebrijes. The Centro de Diseño Oaxaca has worked to join artisans and contemporary designers to create new products based on traditional techniques and to document the development of handcrafts and folk art in the state.

The relationship of crafts to tourism has promoted the opening of a number of museums, generally in the Central Valleys area, to promote and education about the products. These include the Oaxaca Textile Museum (Museo Textile de Oaxaca) founded by the Alfredo Harp Foundation and has a permanent collection of over 1,000 pieces, including some that date from the 17th century. Another example is the state run Museo Estatal de Arte Popular de Oaxaca, which mostly focuses on the barro negro pottery produced in San Bartolo Coyotepec, but contains representative example of all major crafts traditions in the state.

== Challenges ==
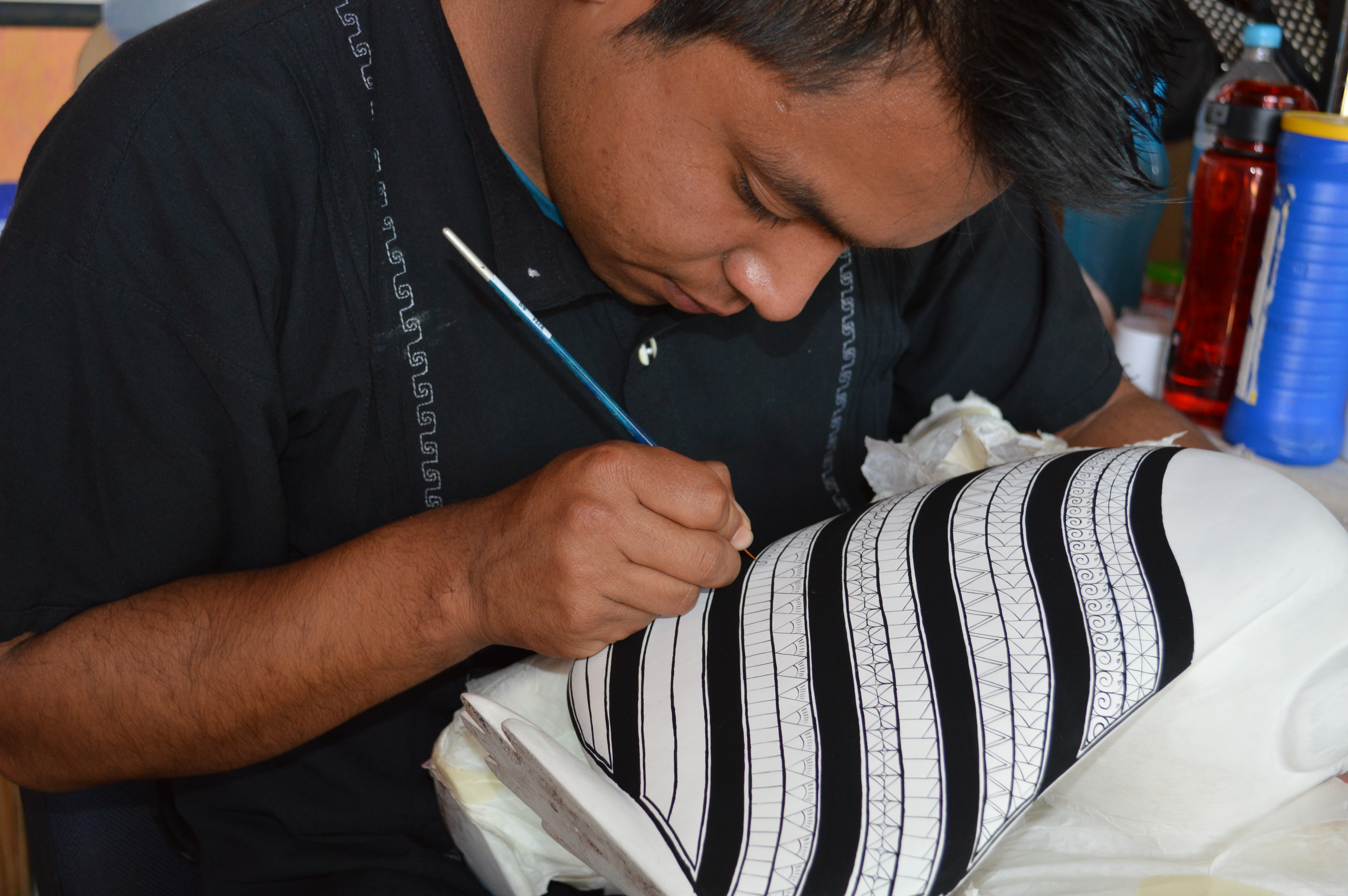
Young artisan adding fine detail to an alebrije

Oaxacan artisans are noted for the quality of their work and business success; however, the industry still faces challenges. There is little to no local demand for products because commercially made equivalents are cheaper and often easier to use. This means that artisans are almost completely dependent on tourism to keep traditions alive. The success of Oaxacan crafts has put strains on the availability of raw materials. One example of this is the over-exploitation of copal trees, whose soft wood is preferred by alebrije carvers. Another challenge is the introduction of cheaper imitations of products, generally from China. To date, few Mexican handcraft products have been eligible for certification guaranteeing authenticity.

Although the promotion of handcrafts and folk art is a priority in the social and economic development of the state, there is still a lack of government support, often due to bureaucracy. Crafts that have a history in a town that dates back at least to the colonial period is more likely to receive support from government entities. Alebrijes is one exception.

The dependency of crafts on the tourism trade means that disruption here has a disproportionate effect on the industry. The 2006 Oaxaca protests severely curtailed tourism to Oaxaca and with it the sales of handcrafts, affecting one of the most vulnerable economic sectors of the state, with sales reduced during the uprising by up to 95% as shops in the historic center were forced to close. This meant that not only vendors in the city were affected but also handcraft producers throughout the Central Valleys who depend on sales in the capital. Political corruption and upheaval, such as the 2006 uprising, have had a negative effect on handcraft sales. The 2006 events hit the artisans hard because as small enterprises, they did not have the resources needed to adapt to rapidly changing conditions. Since tourism centers on the city of Oaxaca, with relatively few venturing to the outlying areas where the products are made, many artisans are dependent on middlemen based in the city and often are in debt to them.

Wood carving and weaving artisans have formed cooperatives and other organizations to continue to promote their work. However, not all artisans have been able to do this. Because of the difficulty in making a living, many artisans emigrate to the United States.

== Towns of the Central Valleys ==
=== Central Valleys ===
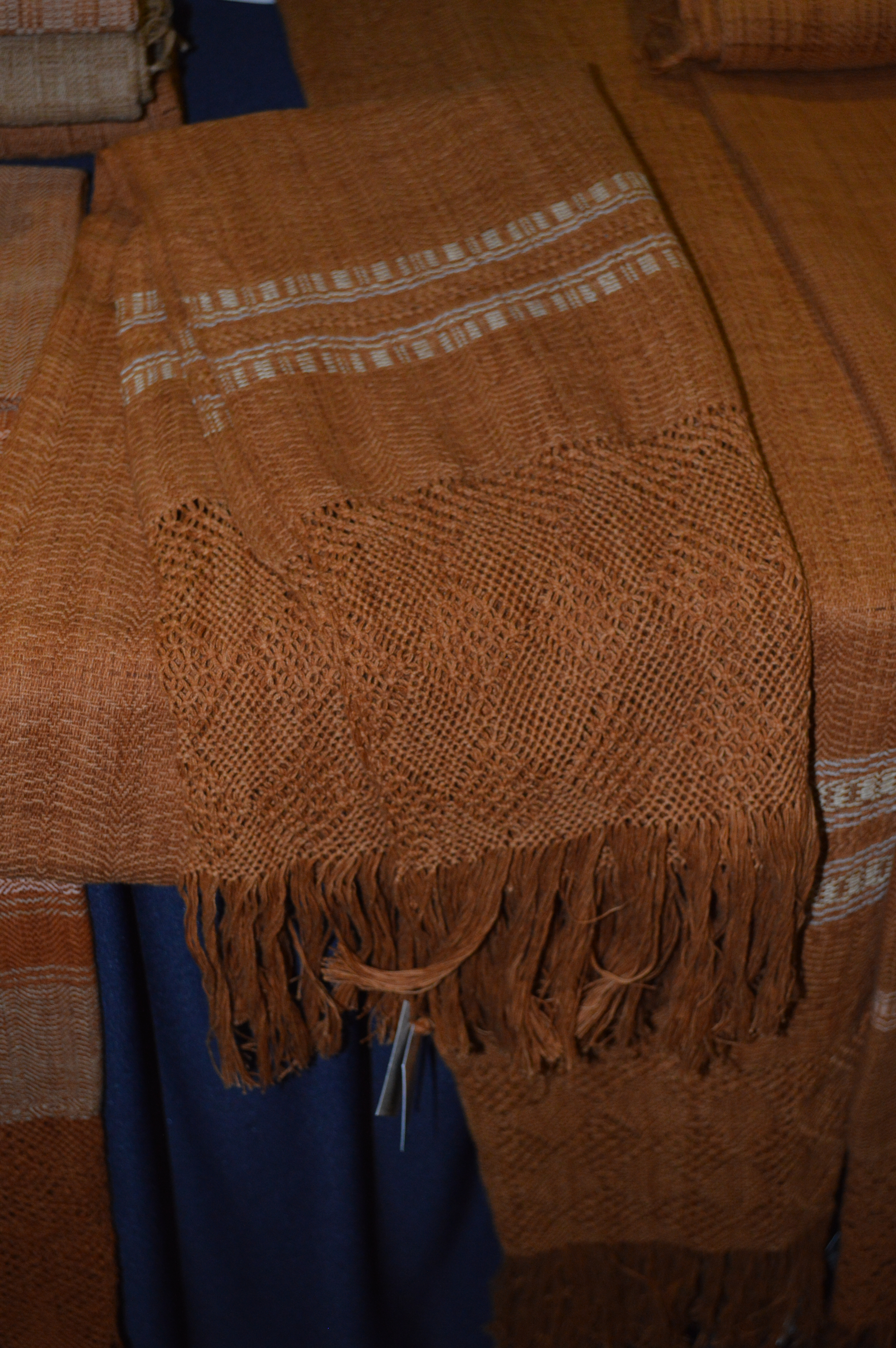
Rebozo from Santa Maria Tlahuitoltepec

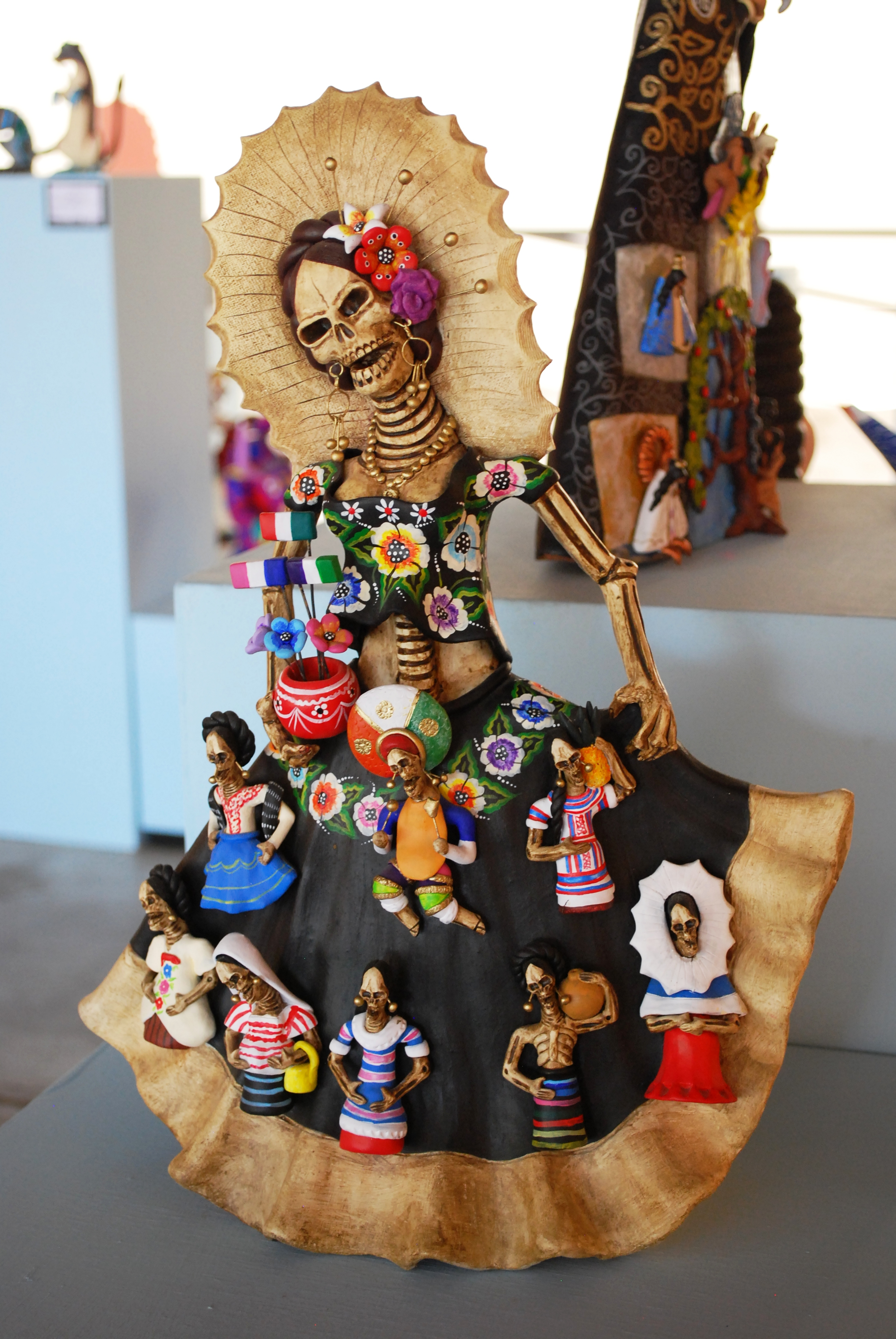
Skeletal ceramic piece by Leopoldo Garcia Aguilar of Ocotlan de Morelos

Handcraft creation is mostly concentrated in the Central Valleys, the Zapotec region of the state. This area has the highest degree of specialization and variety which includes ceramics, stiff fiber weaving (baskets), textiles of wool and cotton, stone work, wood work, the making of mezcal and leather work. Most crafts-producing communities in the area specialize in one type or sub-type of handcraft and most are located in or near the city of Oaxaca.

Merchandise is manufactured for the tourist trade and sold through intermediaries mostly in the city of Oaxaca as relatively few tourists venture into the rural areas where the products are made. Those who do venture outside the capital visit larger producers such as the weaving town of Teotitlan del Valle, and the alebrije carving centers of Arrazola and Tilcajete. As the state center for handcraft distribution, there are numerous outlets including Mercado Benito Juarez, the Casa de las Artesanías de Oaxaca and the Jardín Labastida. Other important regional crafts market in the Central Valleys are the market of Miahuatlán, with stands selling traditional clothing, foods and baskets; the tianguis in Ayoguezco, specializing in furniture and other wood products; and the small market in Etla, specializing in dairy products.

=== Teotitlan and surrounding communities ===
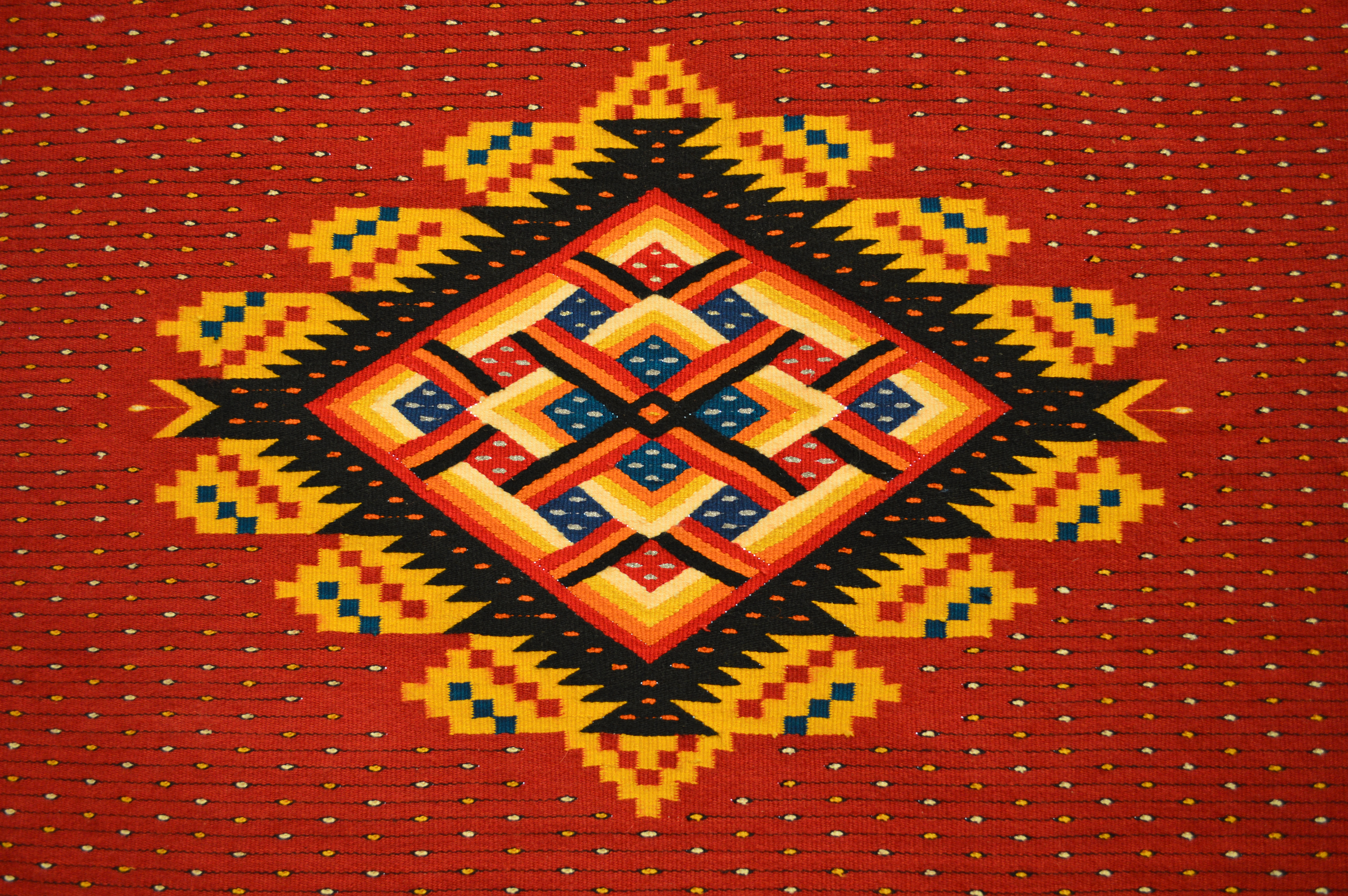
Rug woven by artist/artisan Arnulfo Mendoza in traditional Zapotec design at the Museo de los Pintores Oaxaqueños in the city of Oaxaca

The weaving of wool was introduced to Oaxaca in the colonial period, but the specialization of rug making in Teotitlan del Valle and the surrounding communities dates to the development of weaving for the tourist trade. These products are commercialized mainly in Mexico and in fine galleries and other venues in the United States.

The rugs are made in family workshops located in homes, with most workshops having three looms. Children learn the craft from a very young age, helping with the process with most having their own loom around age 12 to create small items such as bags and wall hangings. While the yarn used remains 100% wool, much of it is pre-dyed with commercial colorings. The craft has adapted in various ways to international trade in the designs used in the works. Some are called “commercial” as they are popular in markets rather than traditional, although traditional Zapotec designs can still be readily found. While most weavings are rugs, other products created here include blankets, pillows, director's chairs, handbags and wall hangings.

Teotitlan is the main producer and marketing center for these wool textiles, making it one of the most prosperous indigenous communities that depends on a handcraft. Tourism to the town began in the 1970s, which gave it its status as an outlet for the even smaller communities around it. The town and surrounding communities still speak Zapotec and marketers have worked to project an image of a single Zapotec community (though the smaller communities tend to produce pieces that show variations). This marketing has led to a class system among the Zapotec in the area, with the middlemen in Teotitlan in tension with producers even before goods reach outside hands.

The smaller communities that produce for sale in Teotitlán del Valle include Santa Ana del Valle, San Miguel del Valle and Díaz Ordáz. In these communities as many as half are dedicated full-time to rug weaving.

=== Atzompa and San Bartolo Coyotepec ===
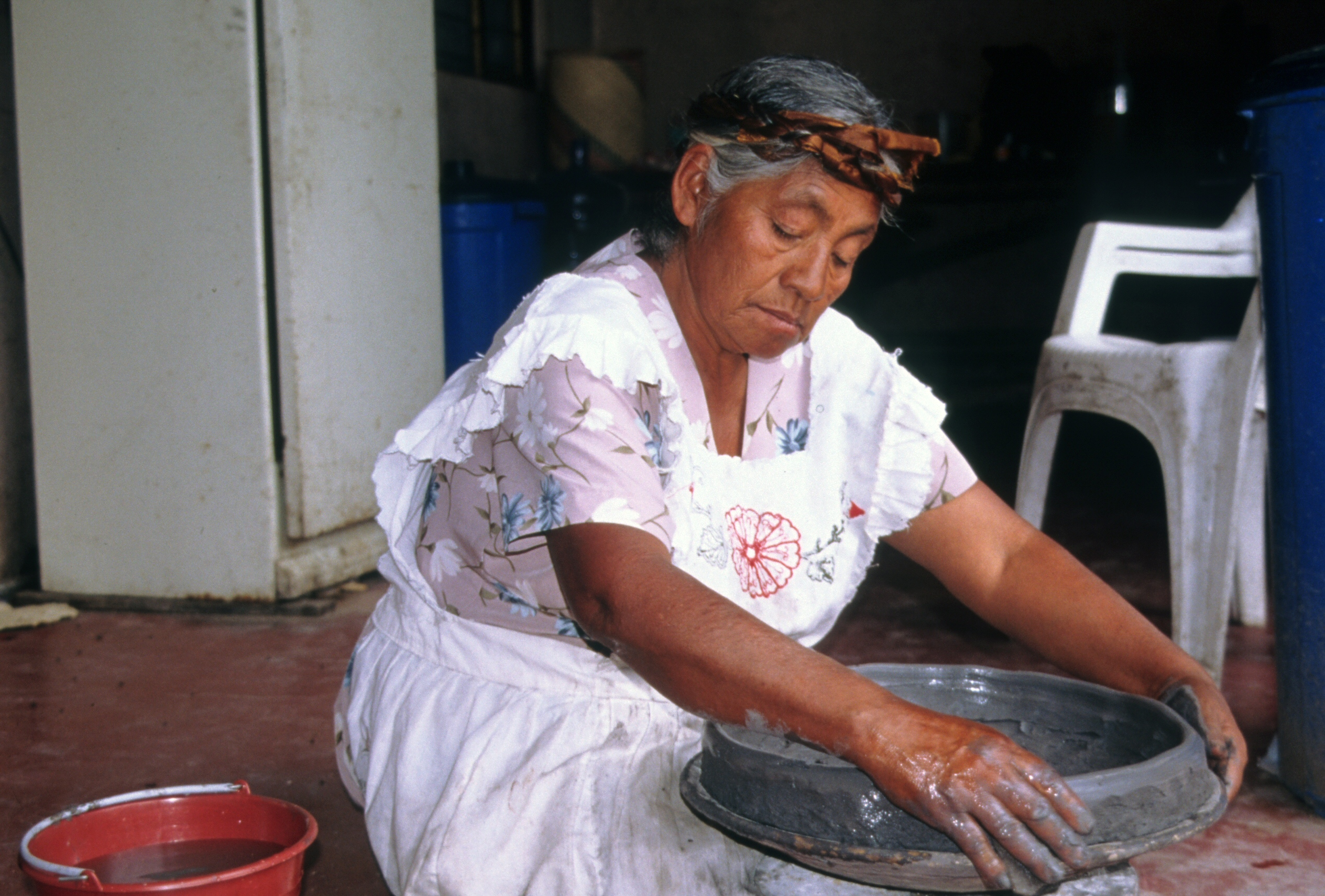
Dolores Porras working in Santa Maria Atzompa

Pottery making can be found in many parts of the state, but the two best-known centers are San Bartolo Coyotepec and Santa Maria Atzompa. Most of Oaxaca's pottery is made without potters’ wheels; instead it is produced with molds or formed by hand, sometimes using a kind of “proto-wheel”, which is a plate or shallow bowl place over an inverted bowl. Ceramics are one of Oaxaca's best known handicrafts in Mexico. The most common glazed pieces include those with base colors of brown and white, shaped into vases, plates, cups and decorative pieces. For utilitarian pieces, molds are most commonly used. For very large pieces, such as cantaros and other storage containers, the molding is done in sections.

San Bartolo Coyotepec is the home of barro negro (black clay) pottery, the most recognized type from the state. Barro negro is a non-glazed pottery, which gets its shine from burnishing, rubbing the dried piece before firing. It is almost exclusively made in the Coyotepec area. These pieces are also decorative and include lamps, large jars called cantaros, bells, masks, wall decorations and more. To encourage visitors, the town hosts the Museo Estatal de Arte Popular de Oaxaca museum and has a Mercado de Artesanias (artisans' market).

Atzompa has been making pottery for at least 500 years. It is widely known for its traditional green glazed cookware and ornamental pieces. The glaze for the green pieces was originally lead-based but that was changed in the 1990s due to health concerns. The green glazed ware is mostly formed into utilitarian items such as pots, cazuelas (casserole dishes), jars, bowls and more. More recently, artisans in the town have been experimenting with various other styles of pottery, mostly decorative times in a variety of styles. One of these is called “pastillaje” where very small and fine pieces of clay are formed and pressed onto the main surface of the piece to create decoration. The town also has an outlet for its wares called the Casa de las Artesanias (House of the Artisans).

=== Arrazola and Tilcajete ===
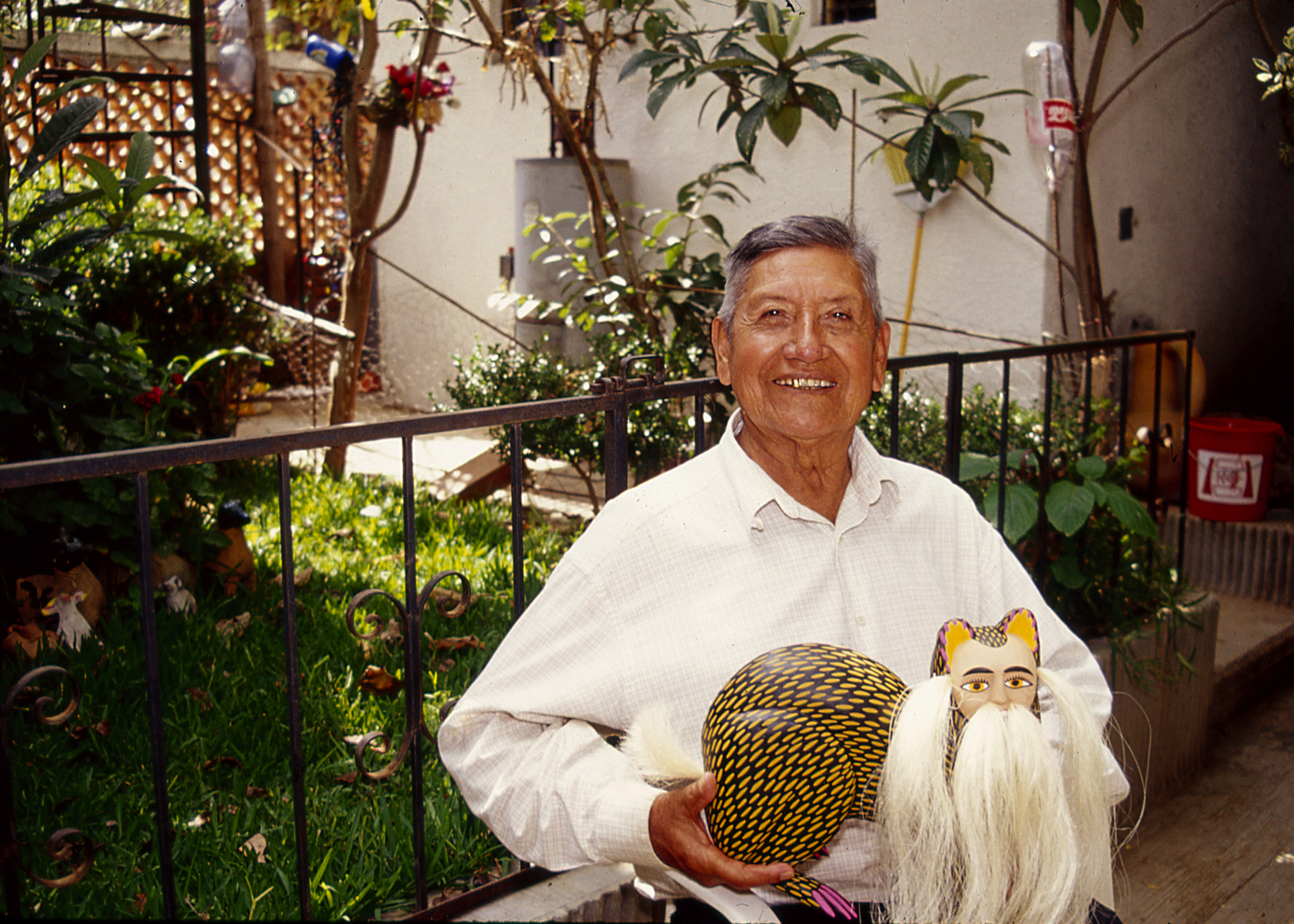
Manuel Jimenez with alebrije

Today, wood in Oaxaca is worked into masks and furniture; there is no local market for wood carving, with all production done for sales to tourists and collectors. By far the most popular wood carving is the making of fantastic animal figures called tonas. These are mostly made in the towns of San Antonio Arrazola and San Martin Tilcajete, with some notable work done in La Unión Tejalapan.

Many buyers of alebrijes assume the works have a longer history in Mexico than they do. They were created in the 20th century, with the concept conceived in 1936 by Mexico City cartonería (papier-mâché) maker Pedro Linares, inspired Manuel Jiménez Ramírez who brought the concept to his hometown in Arrazola, Oaxaca.

The Oaxaca version of "alebrijes", Tonas, differ not only by being smaller and carved from wood, but the figures generally are more recognizable as a single animal such as lions, jaguars, iguanas, dragons, dogs, snakes, rather than an amalgam of various animal parts. The reason for this is that there is a long Zapotec tradition of the carving of wooden figures. The first to develop Tonas was Manuel Jiménez Ramírez of Arrazola, who created them for over thirty years before his death, using soft copal wood which is still preferred. He then painted them in bright colors and with intricate designs. He was followed by Santos Pinos and then the craft spread to others in the town. It was similar in San Martín Tilcajete, where a few pioneering families started the trend there. The two towns originally began selling to tourists but eventually the pieces became collector's items that are now sold in shops and galleries in the US and other countries.

=== Santo Tomás Jalietza ===
The town of Santo Tomás Jalieza specializes in cotton textiles, embroidered items and those woven with a backstrap loom such as blouses, sarapes (shawls), other traditional clothing and tablecloths.

It has been known for its backstrap loom works for at least 400 years, with most of its production in the colonial period sold locally, especially to communities in the Sierra de Villa Alta.

Since the early 20th century the producers in Jalieza have organized to produce and market their wares. The number of craftspeople in Jalieza has increased since the 1940s, and especially since the 1960s when the paving of the highway through the municipality brought tourism. The demand for the textiles by the 1970s was great enough that even men began to participate in what is traditionally women's work, but only inside the home and in private. However, the most successful textiles produced by the community are not the most traditional; instead they are pieces which have been modified to be more attractive to outside markets. Today the quantity and quality of pieces is regulated and promoted collectively, mostly through the Unión de Artesanos. It works to introduce new designs, create new markets and fix prices for merchandise. Then the market was completed in 1970, sales of textiles concentrated there. Many families have specialized in certain garments or other pieces.

=== Basket making communities ===
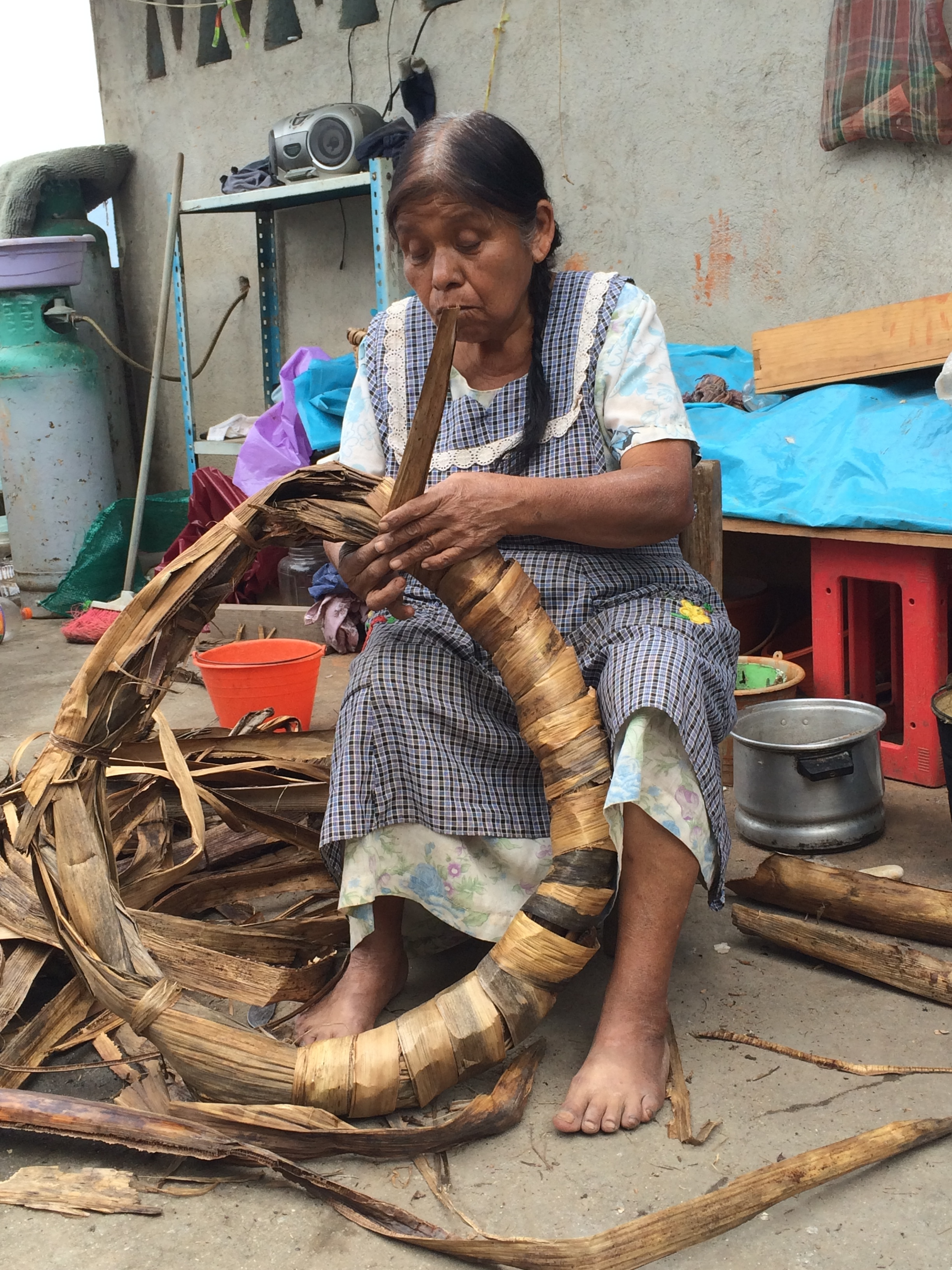
Craftswoman making banana leaf bun in Tavehua, Oaxaca.

Not all crafts are internationally known or collected. One such is the weaving of baskets. This craft is mostly practiced in very small communities in the Central Valleys region, where reeds grow abundantly along riverbanks. In addition to traditional baskets for carrying, the reeds are also fashioned into bird cages, lamps, candy dishes and screens/curtains. Towns best known for this activity include Etla, Ocotlán de Morelos, Tlacolula, Santa Cruz Papalutla, Santa Ana del Valle, Villa Diaz Ordaz and San Miguel del Valle.

As these areas are not generally visited by tourists, the main outlets for baskets is the Centro de Abastos (wholesale food market) in the city of Oaxaca and the Sunday tianguis in Tlacolula. This craft has not been promoted by governmental and other entities, as other crafts have been, and which is crucial to creating a wider market and to adapting the craft to modern tastes. For this reason, and the fact that the local market is dwindling, the craft is in decline. One reason for the non-support of basket making is that the product is associated with rural areas rather than modern urban ones.

=== Octolán de Morelos ===
One exception to the specialization to one type of handcraft is the town of Octolán de Morelos, location south of the city of Oaxaca. The best known of the town's handcrafts is its pottery, the making of which is dominated by women. The best known potters are the Aguilar family, dominated by sisters Josefina, Guillermina, Irene and Concepción who create fanciful multicolored figurines.

Ocotlán is noted for its production of hand-crafted knives and other blades. Apolinar Aguilar Velasco is one of the best-known for making knives, swords, machetes and the like using the same techniques as those used in the 16th century. Aguilar began making blades when he was ten, taught by his father and uncle. He is now teaching the craft to the next generation.

=== Tlacolula de Matamoros ===
Tlacolula is a small city east of the state capital. It is also known for various cottage industries especially the production of mezcal and wrought iron, but also for some textiles. While mezcal is produced all over Oaxaca, Tlacolula is considered the center of production. The beverage is made from various types of maguey plant such as tobalá, espadín and arroquense, either found wild or cultivated. The drink comes in a number of varieties, depending on the maguey used, the roasting and fermentation processes used and the aging. Although not all types use it, the “worm” in the bottle (really a larva) is associated with mezcal, not tequila. Mezcal is bottled straight or combined with flavorings to create cream style liquors.

Metal is also worked in the city, especially tin and iron, which were introduced by the Spanish. Tin in worked in mostly decorative items such as mirror frames and figures. Iron is worked into knives, daggers and other blades, machetes, tableware. Tlacolula is particularly noted for its production of wrought iron railings for buildings.

=== Other communities ===
There is not much production of handcrafts in the city of Oaxaca itself. One exception to this is the working of sheet metal, which was established in the colonial period. The metal is mostly used for the making of candle holders and frames for windows and mirrors, along with fantasy figures and Christmas decorations. The Xochimilco neighborhood of the city is known for the production of tablecloths, napkins and other such linens.

In Valle de Etla, one group of indigenous residents has taken to collecting old tires found on the highway and have begun converting them into handcrafts. The craft idea began with Esteban Perada, originally from Santiago Suchilquitongo. Originally he used them to support washers and retaining walls and car bumpers. Getting creative, he found a way to convert a tire into a toucan design to hang flowerpots, painting it bright colors. Others liked it and requested the item for their gardens. Since then he and others have created other figures such as parrots, squirrels and more, selling enough to supplement family income.

The town of San Juan Teitipac makes stone products, but two of their traditional product, mutates and molcajetes, have mostly been replaced by blenders and mixers.

== Other parts of the state ==
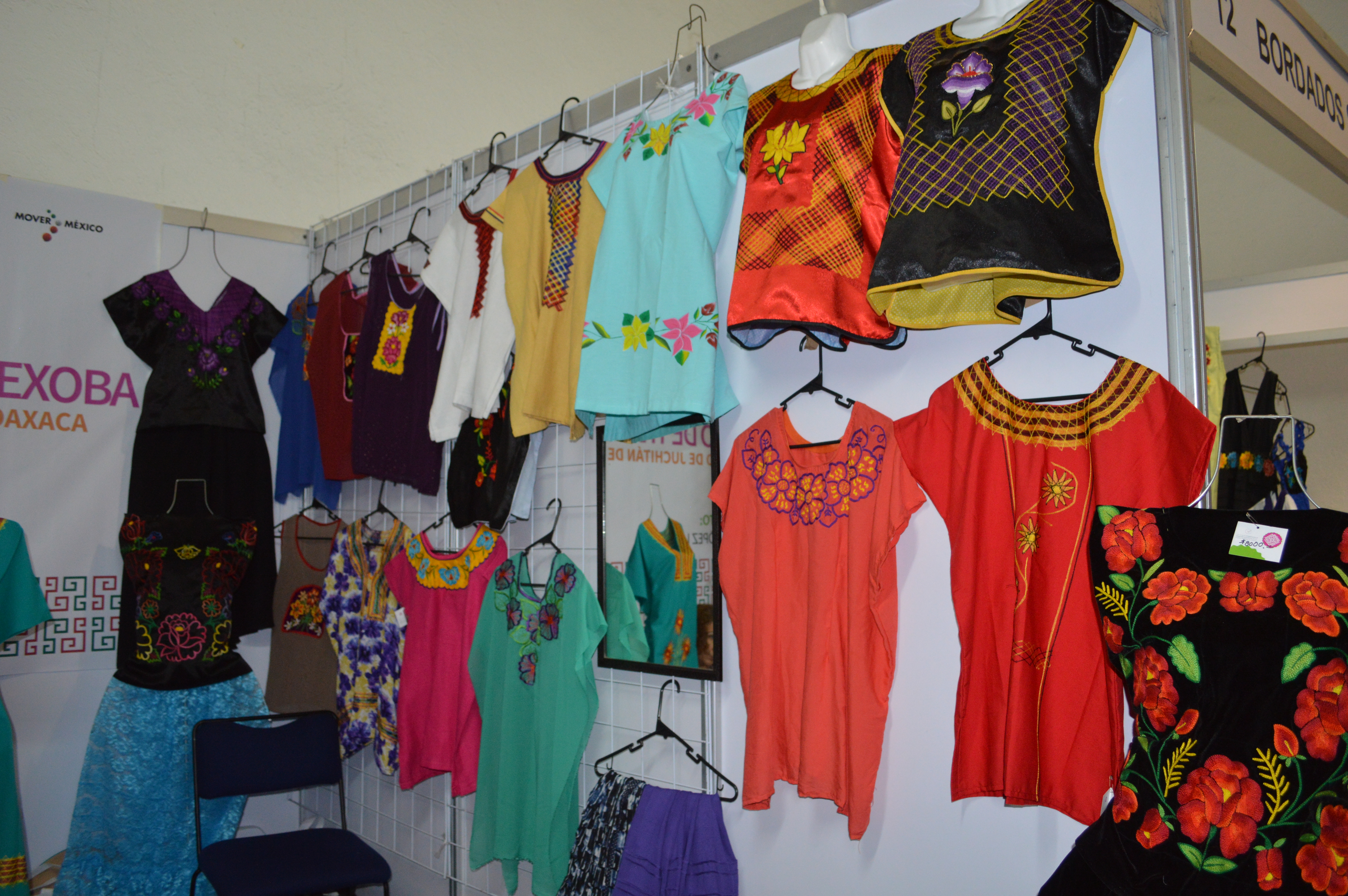
Huipils and blouses from Juchitán

There are artisans in other parts of the state, although they are not as well known.

The state has a wide variety of textile traditions, with many communities having distinctive styles of dress and designs. The Chinateca region in the north of the state is known for its unique huipil designs, made by the local Chinanteca and Mazatec peoples. Each town has its own variations and there are three types of huipils, those for everyday use, semi formal and formal.

Wrought iron and other metal work is found in the towns of Tlaxiaco in the west and Santa Catarina Juquila and Santiago Jamiltepec in the southwest of the state, generally practical items such as knives. The last is known for a local style of machete.

The Tehuantepec area produces an orange-colored pottery, which is highly resistant to breakage and generally used for tile, flowerpots and other heavy duty items. For decorative items, pastillaje is also use to add flowers and other foliage and may be fired a second time to affix coloring. In Juchitan, wares include traditional local dress for men and women, clay dolls and masks, key chains, local candies and mezcal. Most Juchitan artisans must rely on intermediaries to get products to market. However, over fifty workshops in the Juchitan area has banded into a cooperative to promote their products, especially in May when the city hold its regional fair which attracts many visitors. The group also works to have products available at other events in the state, especially during the main tourist seasons.

Gold and silver jewelry is produced in the Tehuantepec area, both through the filigree method introduced by the Spanish as well as hand-hammered pieces. One local variety of jewelry is made from antique gold coins. Filigree and hammered pieces are also produced in Huajuapan de León, often reproductions of jewelry found in Monte Albán and other archeological sites.

The weaving of palm fronds is most commonly done in the tropical Mixtec region of the state in the west and includes hats, mats, flower vases and small purses. The most noted community for this work is Tlaxiaco, which also makes fine textiles and linens.

Most leatherwork can be found in Ejutla de Crespo and Jalatlaco, whose products are exported to other countries. Notable pieces include scabbards for machetes, saddles, wallets, belts, portfolios and more. The leather is made from the skins of local animals. Leather pieces such as belts and bags can be found embroidered with ixtle fiber, which is extracted from maguey leaves.

Coffee is grown and processed in the mountain areas near the coast, especially in the municipalities of Santa María Huatulco, Pluma Hidalgo, Candelaria Loxicha, San Miguel del Puerto, San Mateo Piñas, Santiago Xanica, and San Pedro Pochutla. This tradition dates from the 17th century when the coffee plant was introduced by English pirates, later developed in the 20th century by German immigrants.

== Notable artisans ==
- Carlomagno Pedro Martínez
- Doña Rosa
- Aguilar family (Oaxacan potters)
- Blanco family (Oaxacan potters)
- José García Antonio
- Fortunato Hernández Bazán
- Manuel Jiménez Ramírez
- Agustín Cruz Tinoco
- Apolinar Aguilar Velasco
- Josefina Aguilar
- Arnulfo Mendoza
- Teodora Blanco Núñez
- Jacobo Angeles
