= Aguilar family (Oaxacan potters) =

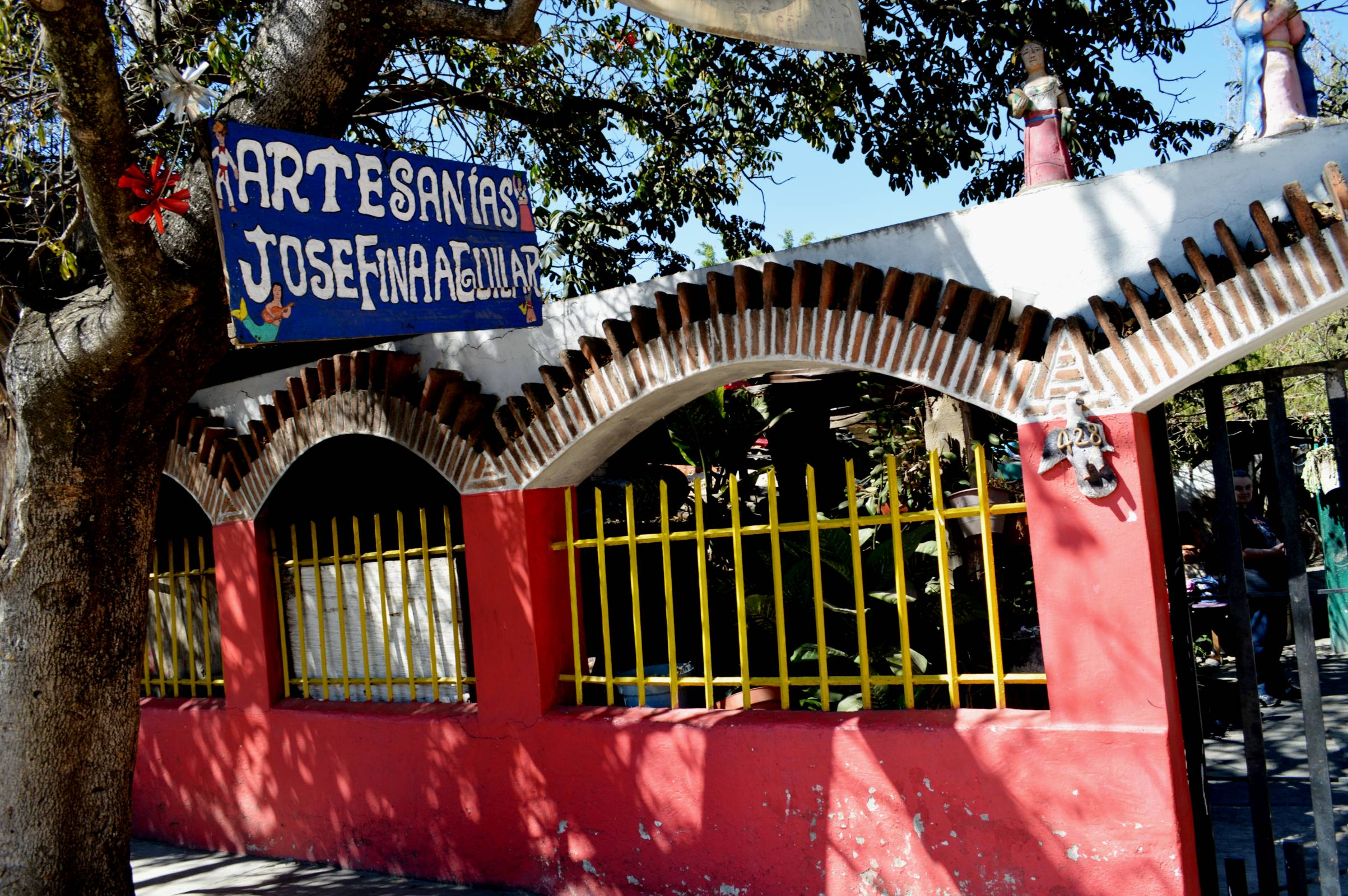
Studio of Josefina Aguilar Alcántara in Ocotlán de Morelos

The Aguilar family are clay-making artisans from Ocotlán de Morelos, a rural town in the state of Oaxaca, Mexico. The town's clay production included only utilitarian items until Isaura Alcántara Díaz and her husband, Jesús Aguilar Revilla, expanded their wares into decorative figures and religious items. The couple passed their craft down to their daughters Guillermina, Josefina, Irene, and Concepción, who have continued to innovate their own styles and techniques around subject matters related to the life and traditions in Oaxaca as well as iconic Mexican figures. The family craft and artistic recognition lives on through the children and grandchildren of these four women.

== Family origins ==
Isaura Alcántara Díaz (1924–1968) was married to Jesús Aguilar Revilla and together they had eight children. Isaura began her clay-making journey in an effort to make money for her family. She initially made utilitarian items, such as basin-like tubs that became known as apaxtles, incense burners, and other naturally-colored clay items that were useful to her community. Eventually, Isaura would find inspiration from her everyday life and implement scenes from Ocotlán de Morelos into her craft. She began making figures that were strictly decorative and depicted the people around her - mothers with their children, vendors at the market, and celebratory events, among others. Isaura's work would go on to receive recognition from collectors such as Alexander Girard and Nelson Rockefeller, who both bought her work when visiting Oaxaca. Her work also inspired her children, most of whom have continued the craft and received accolades of their own. She became ill from cancer and died at 44 years old.

== Second generation ==
Of the couple's eight children, four would go on to grow their craft into a practice and way of living: Guillermina, Josefina, Irene, and Concepción. Having learned from their mother before her death, they expanded on their mother's decorative practice to create their own respective styles and body of work. Common themes found throughout their work include religious imagery, scenes and people from life in Oaxaca, as well as iconic figures such as Frida Kahlo.

=== Guillermina Aguilar Alcántara ===
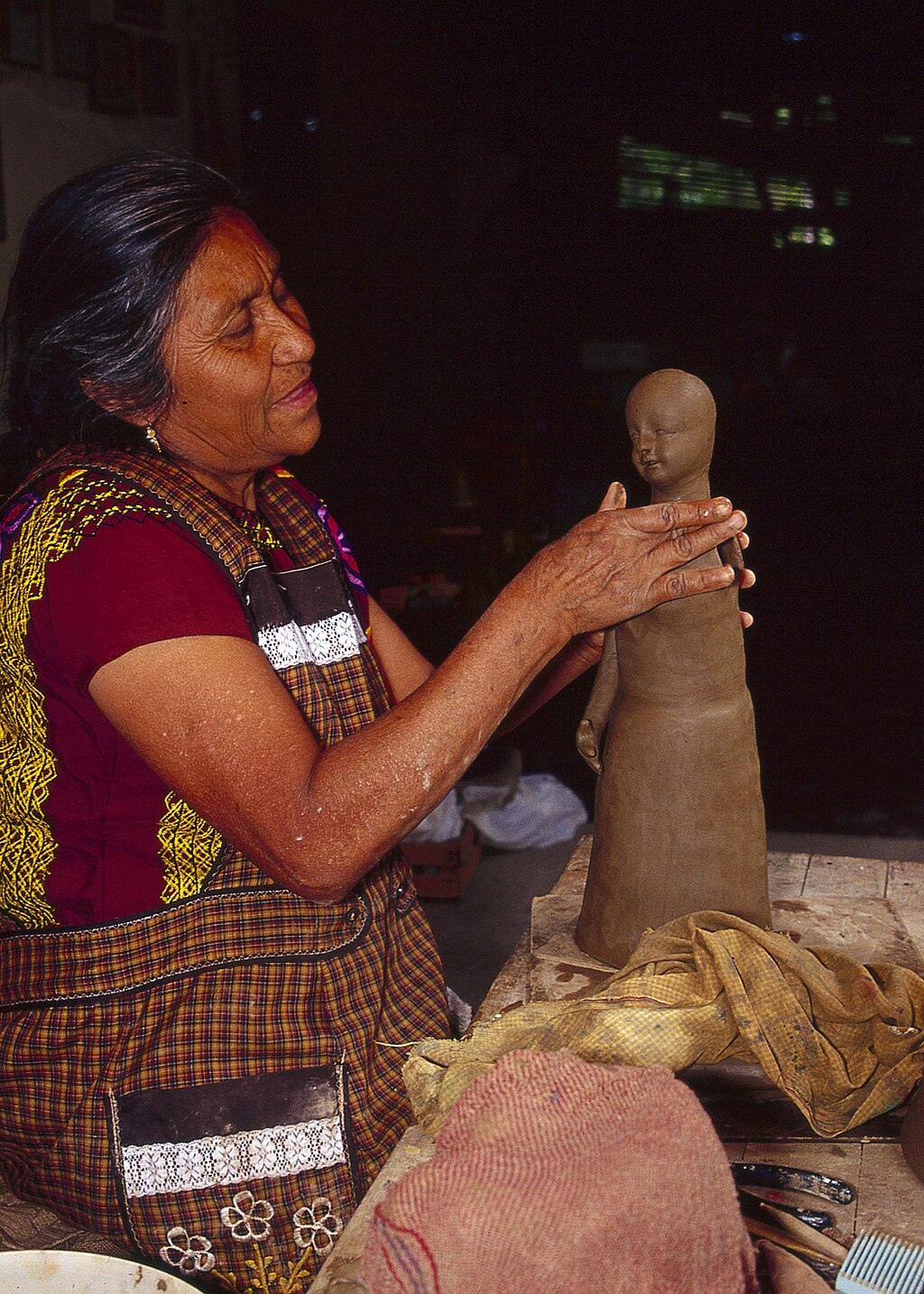
Guillermina Aguilar Alcántara working with clay

Born in 1943, Guillermina Aguilar Alcántara is the first-born daughter of Isaura Alcántara Díaz and Jesús Aguilar Revilla. At an early age, she would help her mother with household chores and received no formal education. Guillermina started her artistic practice through the modeling of animal figures and would later expand her craft to reflect her surroundings and cultural customs with events such as weddings, wakes, and baptisms, to name a few. Additionally, Guillermina's work often depicts female figures in their traditional Oaxacan dress with expressive facial features as well as elements of nature.

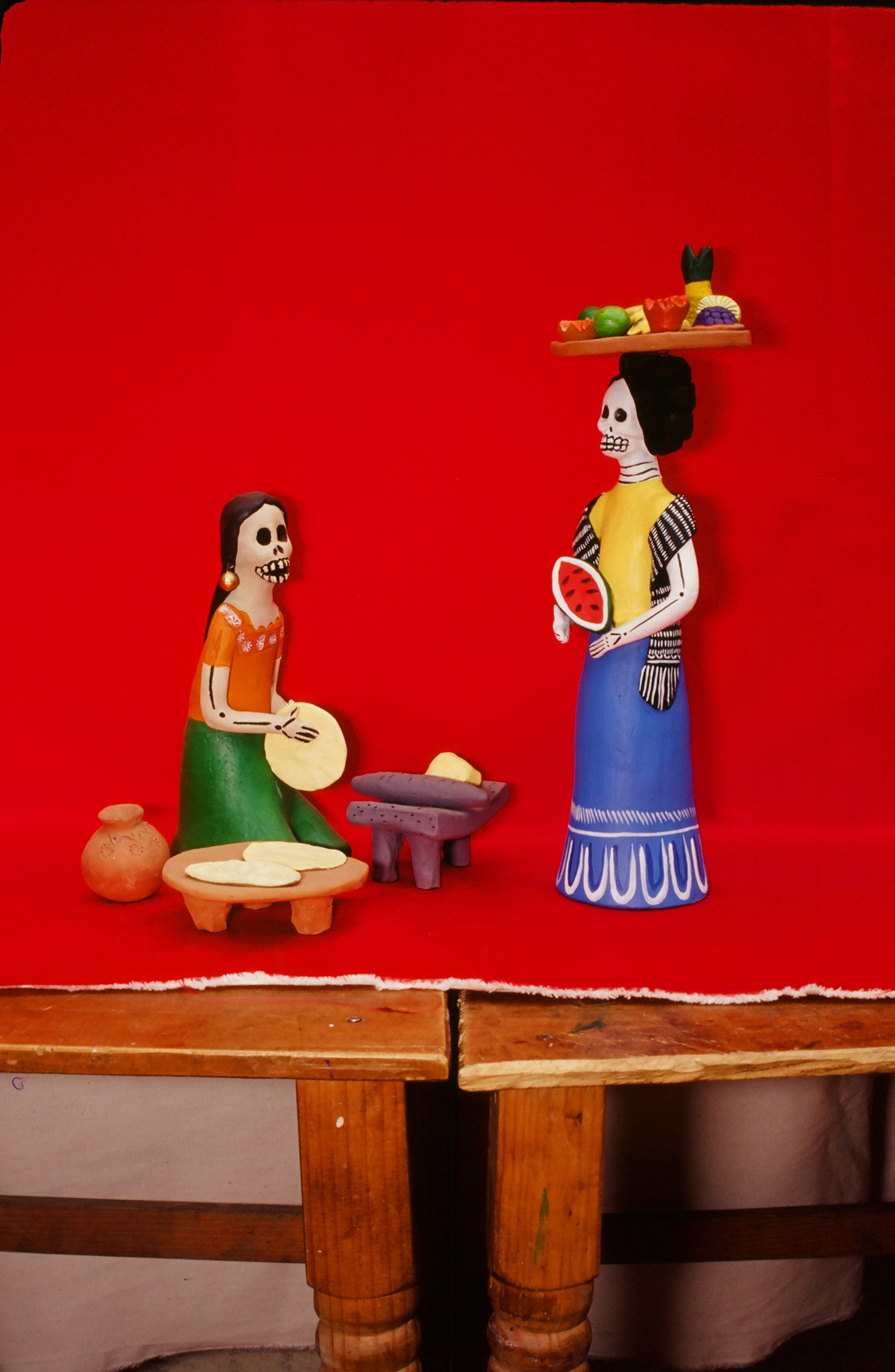
Ceramic Day of the Dead figures by Guillermina Aguilar Alcántara

During the peak of her career, Guillermina would often work 16+ hour days; now, she is able to work four with the help of her children. Her hands are cited as her favorite artistic tools and she is grateful for the life she's been able to build from her craft. She also holds clay in high esteem, as it is laborious to collect and that has informed her perspective on the art form.

Guillermina was featured with her sister, Irene, in the book Grandes Maestros del Arte Popular Mexicano (2001), published by Fomento Cultural Banamex. Her work is known in Mexico, the U.S., and Europe.

=== Josefina Aguilar Alcántara ===
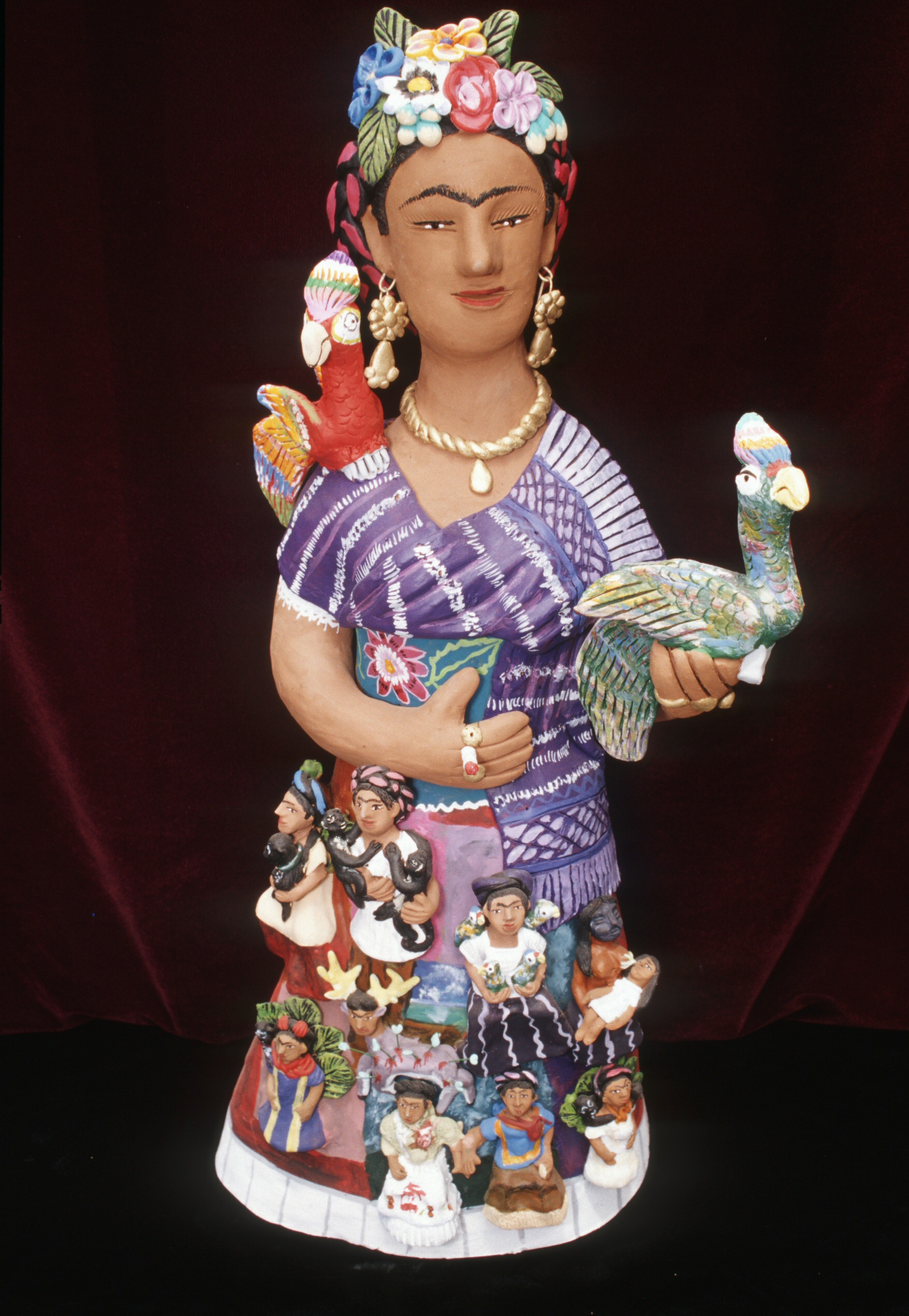
Frida Kahlo figure made by Josefina Aguilar Alcántara

Main Article: Josefina Aguilar Alcántara

Born in 1945, Josefina Aguilar Alcántara began working with clay at the age of six years old after being taught by her mother, Isaura. She worked with her mother on orders and in 1978, Nelson Rockefeller came to their village and bought a set of figures made by Josefina. She would go on to marry and have nine children, whom she would teach and mentor with the craft of clay-making. Josefina's work includes scenes from her village, "women of the night," muñecas, and religious imagery such as the Last Supper.

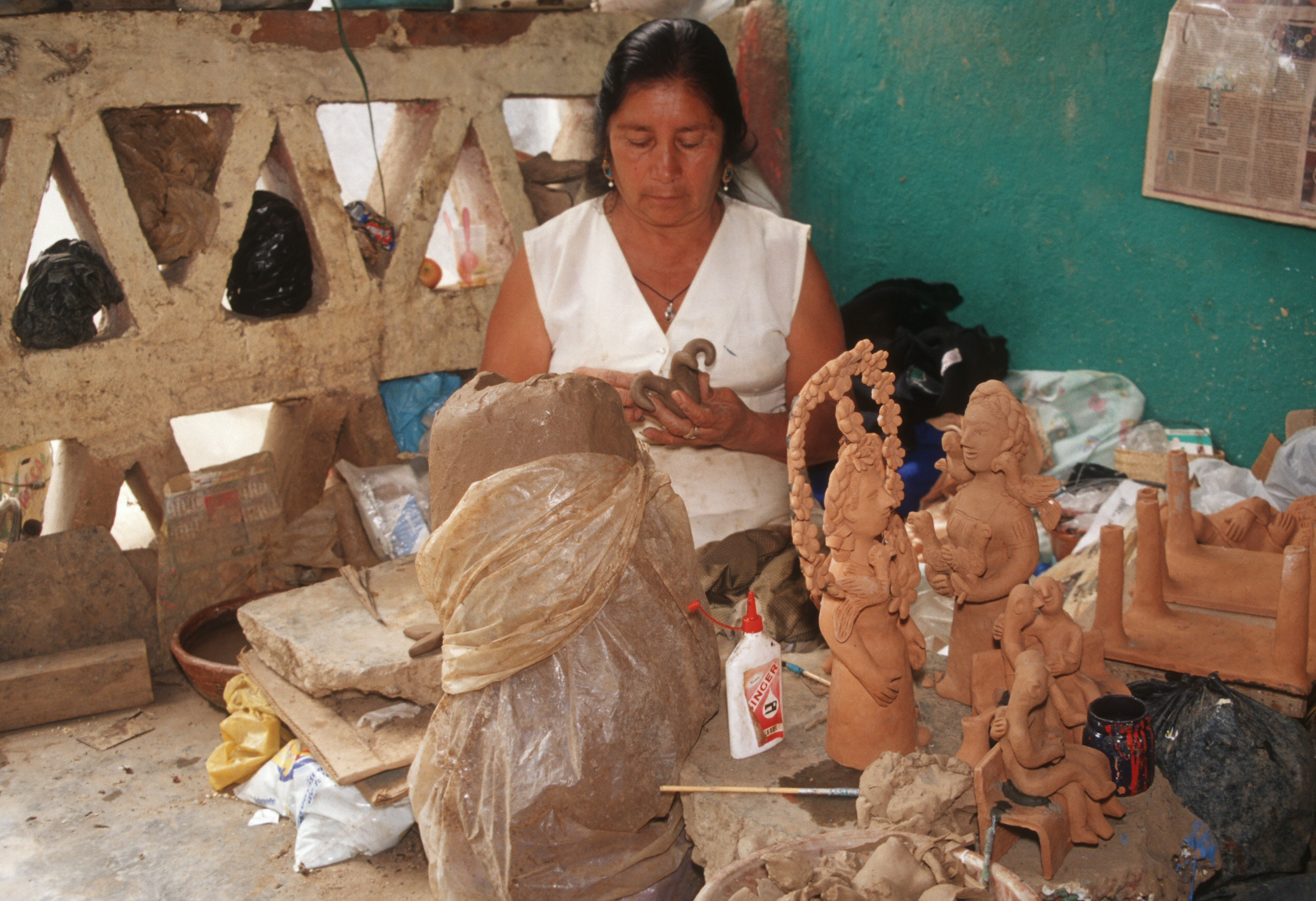
Josefina Aguilar Alcántara working with clay

When there was high demand for her work, she would often work 12-hour days. She has since lost her vision due to diabetes, and so is assisted in her work by her children. When asked how she continues to craft her art pieces, she emphasizes her mind and her hands as being the most important to the process, not her vision.

=== Irene Aguilar Alcántara ===
Born in September 1951, Irene Aguilar Alcántara was taught by her mother, Isaura, the ways of clay-making at an early age. Initially, she had wanted to be a nurse; however, she was taken out of school in her youth in order to help care for her family. Her clay practice first included mostly utilitarian items that could be found in the kitchen. She eventually developed inspiration from the events and people around her, creating scenes of celebrations and milestones. At 16 years old, Irene worked tirelessly to get money for her mother's treatment, who had become ill from cancer. However, her mother would pass in 1968, Irene being only 17 years old. To this day, she thinks of her mother when working and is thankful for the guidance she was given.

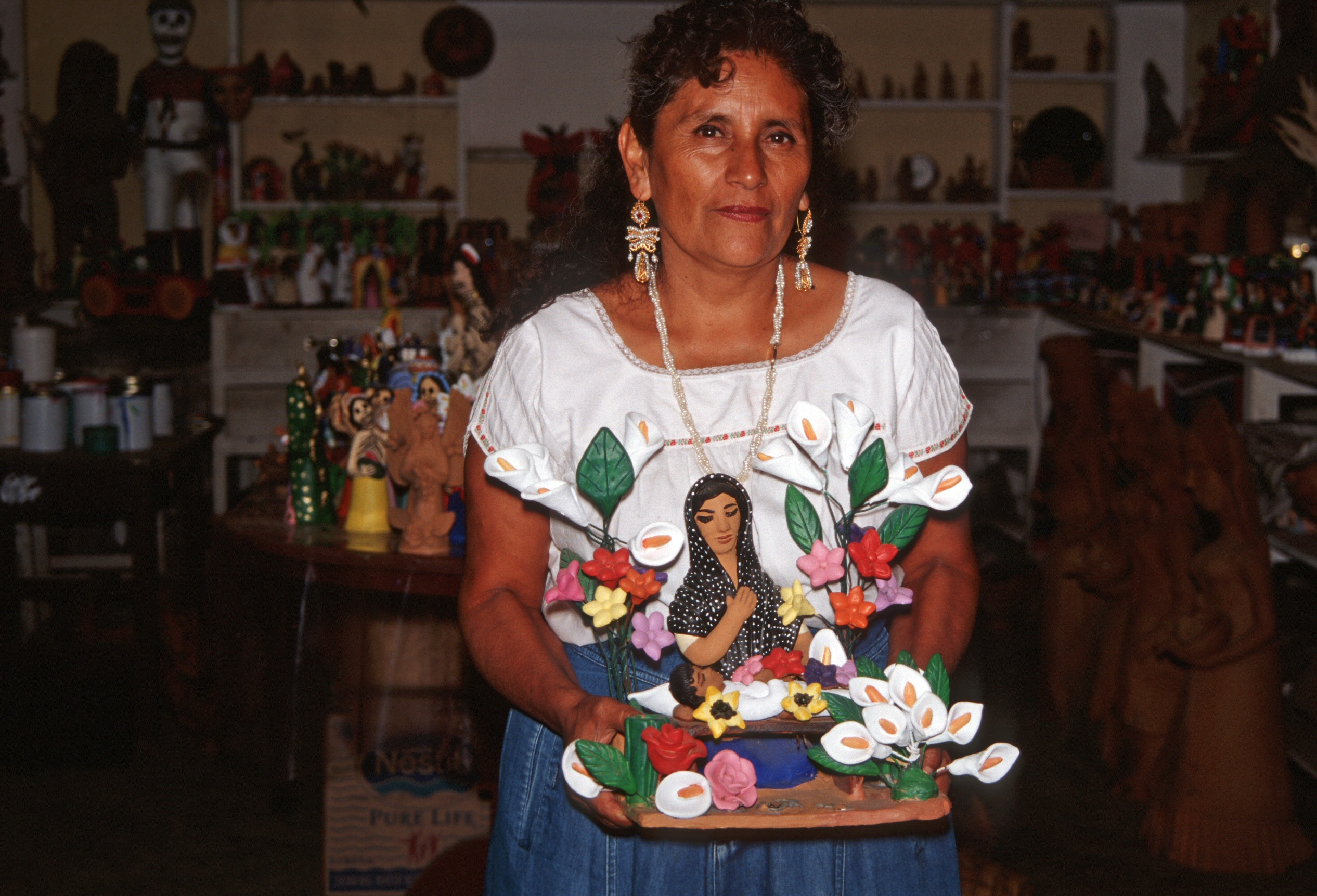
Irene Aguilar Alcántara holding a clay piece depicting the funeral of a child

Irene considers herself to be a perfectionist, as she would take longer than her sisters to create new pieces. Her subject matters include customs of her village and female figures such as women with flowers, prostitutes, and Catrinas, among others. Her clay pieces also include depictions of Frida Kahlo, which are well known in the United States. Early in her career, she was commissioned for 120 pieces for the Nuevo Mexico gallery and has been part of multiple exhibitions in the U.S., including Chicago, Houston, Dallas, Arizona, Colorado, and New Mexico. Her work has also been shown in Colombia and Canada.

Irene was featured with her sister, Guillermina, in the book Grandes Maestros del Arte Popular Mexicano (2001), published by Fomento Cultural Banamex.

=== Concepción Aguilar Alcántara ===
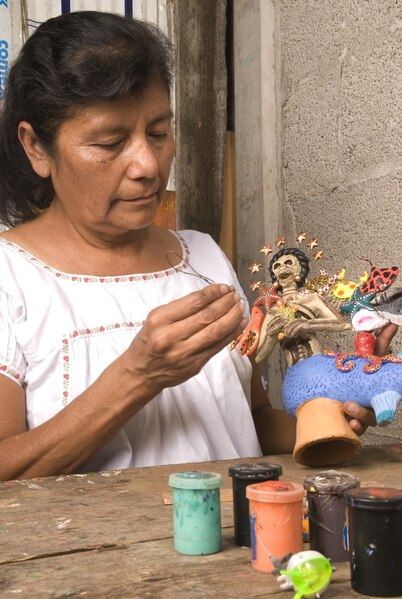
Concepción Aguilar Alcántara working with clay

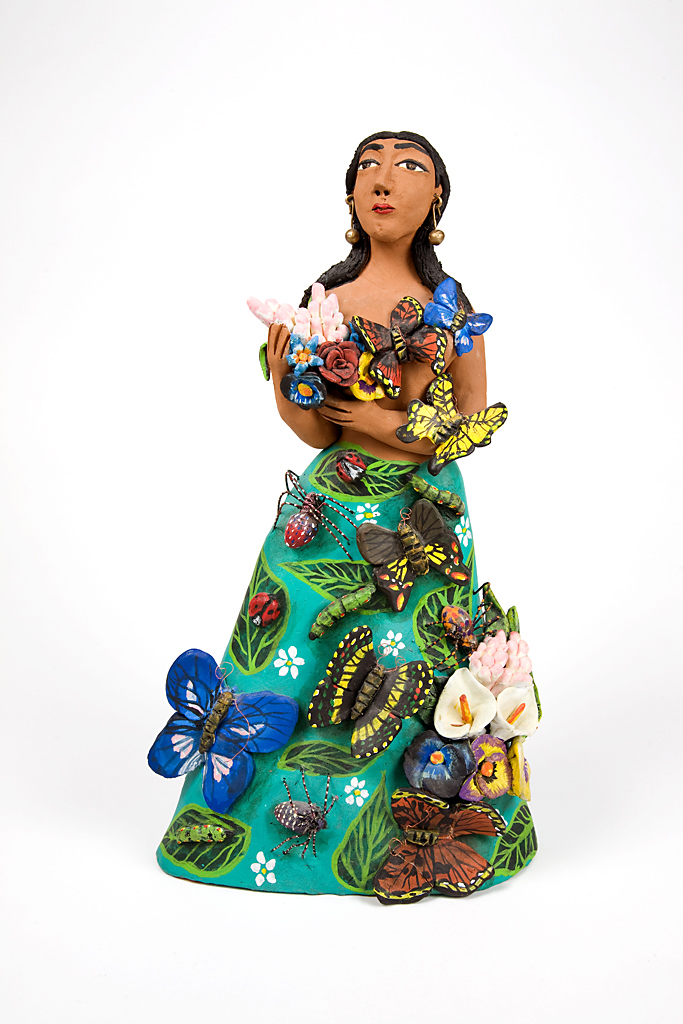
Ceramic piece of a woman with butterflies by Concepción Aguilar Alcántara

Born in 1956, Concepción Aguilar Alcántara learned how to work with clay from her father, Jesús. Her mother died when she was eight years old. She sold her first piece at the age of twelve years old and continued her practice from there. She would go on to marry Jorge Sánchez Ruíz, who often collaborates with her when making art. Like her father, she and Jorge have also taught their children the craft of clay-making. Concepción's favorite tools to work with, besides her hands, include the maguey and wedge. She draws inspiration from many things, including silence itself. Motifs in her work include religious imagery, such as Noah's Ark, Day of the Dead festivities, elements of nature like cacti, and Frida Kahlo figures. She utilizes bright color in her work to depict such imagery.

== Third Generation ==
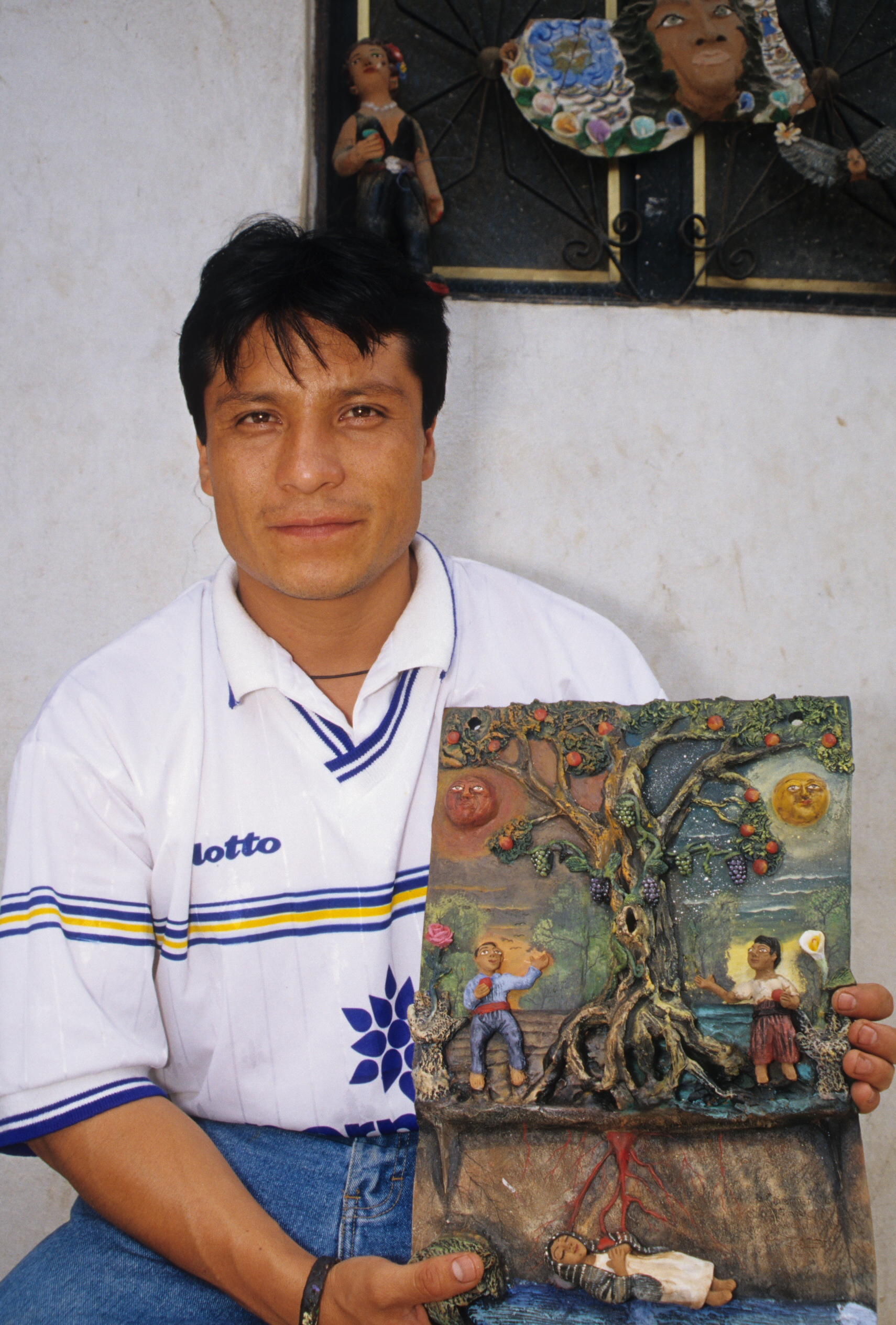
Untitled work by Demetrio García Aguilar

The family practice of ceramics continues on through the children of Guillermina, Josefina, Irene, and Concepción. They have crafted their own artistic processes and become notable in their own right.

=== Demetrio García Aguilar ===
Born in 1968, Demetrio García Aguilar is one of eight sons born to Josefina Aguilar Alcántara. He began learning the craft of clay-making through his parents at the age of eight years old. His mother is cited as a major influence to his work, as the faces of his figures are distinctive in a way reminiscent of Josefina. He also draws from his dreams when making artwork and finds it to be a spiritual expression he enjoys sharing with others. Additionally, Demetrio finds inspiration from his Zapotec roots and incorporates social and political themes into his work, as he states they are vital to art itself. Regarding his physical practice with clay, Demetrio is known to use black paint when starting his pieces; this affects the tone of his art into a more often somber mood.

=== Fernando García Aguilar ===
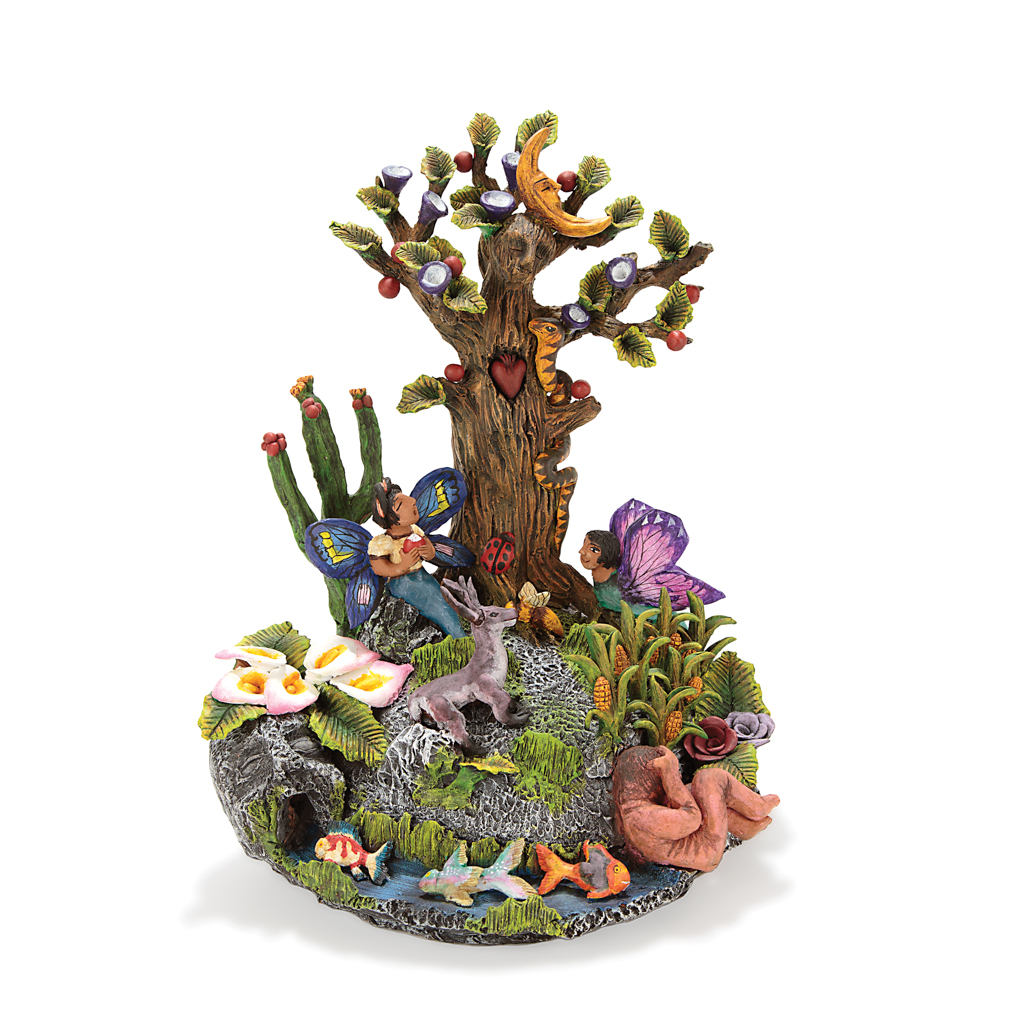
Ceramic piece Mother Earth by Fernando García Aguilar

Fernando García Aguilar is the second son born to Josefina Aguilar Alcántara. He has continued to work with clay throughout his lifetime and was given an honorable mention in ceramics from the Friends of Oaxacan Folk Art in 2013. Fernando explored the circle of life within his art submission, utilizing underwater and land features to reflect the importance of Mother Earth.

=== José Juan García Aguilar ===
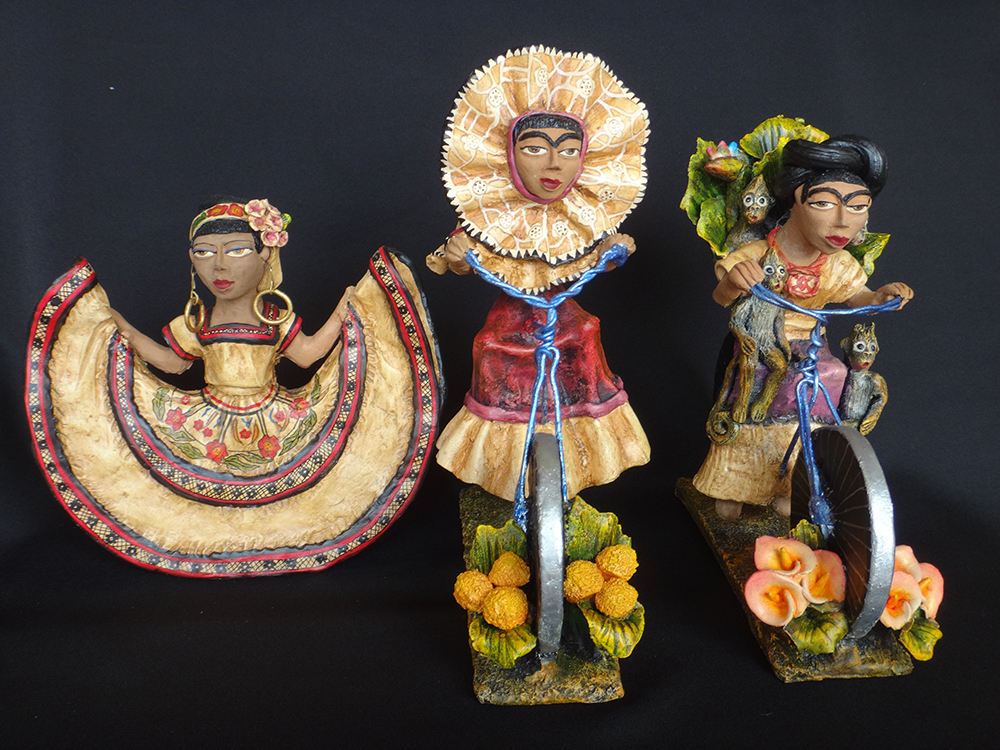
Figures by José Juan García Aguilar

José Juan García Aguilar, born in 1974, is the son of Josefina Aguilar Alcántara. He considers his mother to be an inspiration to his work, as she began to teach him the craft when he was eight years old. José has continued honing his skills since finding success early on, having sold his first piece at nine years old. When discussing the importance of clay, he believes it possesses a soul and has connection to memory and cultural history just like people do.

=== Leticia García Aguilar ===
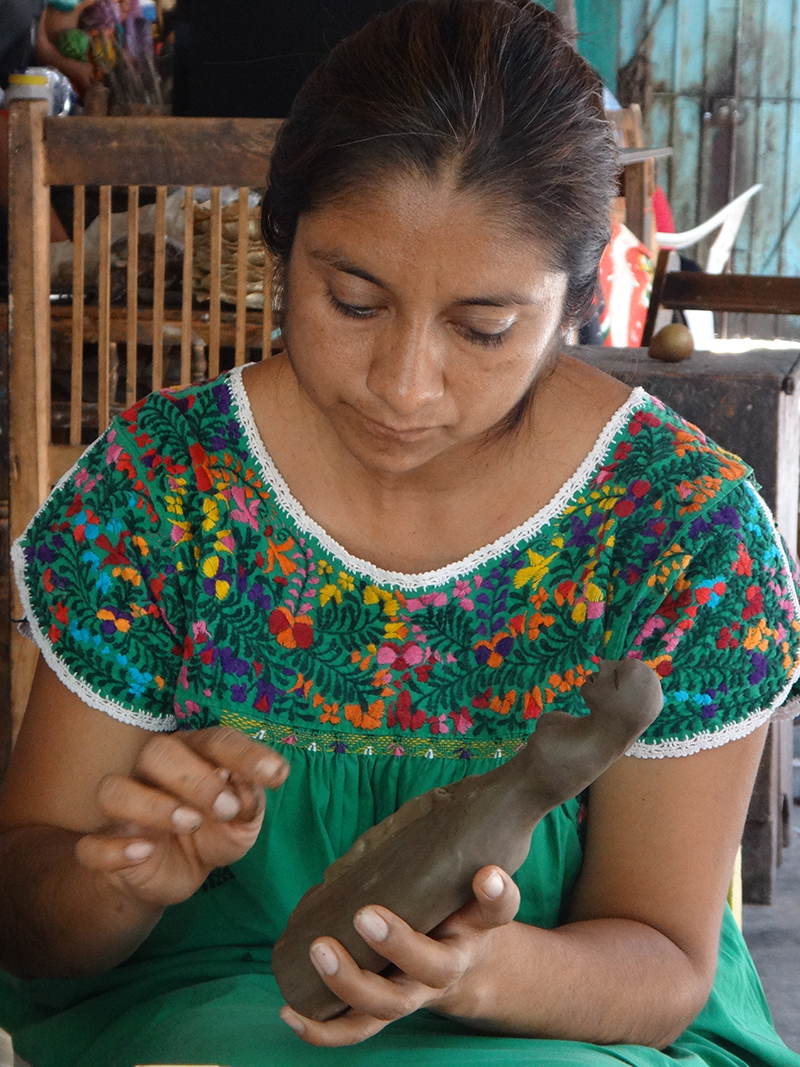
Photo of Leticia García Aguilar

Leticia García Aguilar was born in 1978 and is the only girl of nine children born to Josefina Aguilar Alcántara. She started working with clay as a young girl, intrigued from watching her mother work. Leticia's art is known to have a notable use of color as well as expressive faces in her figures. She draws inspiration from nature, myths, her indigenous culture, and the many facets of womanhood. In developing her practice, Leticia has learned to let the artistic process flow naturally and to not let an idea restrict her creative journey.

=== Rodrigo Eriverto García Aguilar ===
Rodrigo Eriverto García Aguilar, son of Josefina Aguilar Alcántara, learned to work with clay when he was eight years old. He finds inspiration from the life around him in his pueblo. In his work, he is known to sculpt human faces onto animal forms and has remarked that animals have a high intelligence and a stronger appreciation for the natural world than we as humans do. He paints his clay works and is often assisted by his wife in doing so.

=== Sergio García Aguilar ===
Born in 1981, Sergio García Aguilar is the third son born to Josefina Aguilar Alcántara. He began his work in clay-making at five years old, and eventually sold his first pieces at eight. This purchase, a set of monster figures, lead to a 16-piece commission of the same creature type. Sergio has emphasized the importance of knowing the clay-making process, especially the laborious effort that goes into collecting it from the local mines. He believes that knowledge of this work will lead to a greater appreciation for the art form itself. Ceramics is a large facet of Sergio's identity, and he has stated that it "carries the essence and soul of who I am."

=== Alba Noemí López Zárate ===
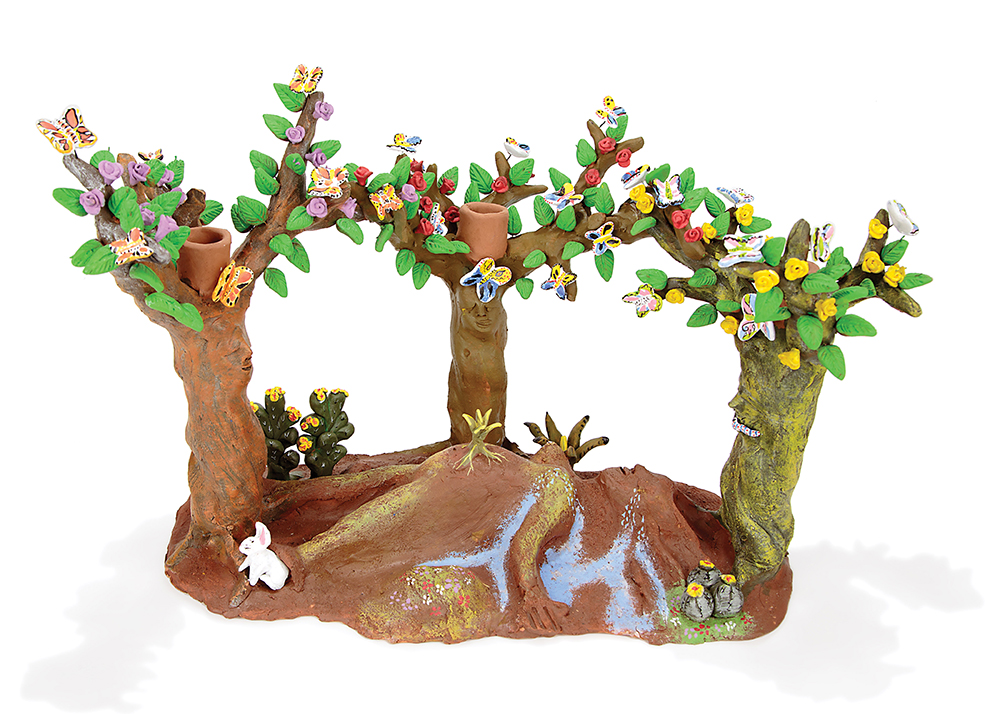
Ceramic piece by Alba Noemì López Zárate

Alba Noemí López Zárate is the wife of Sergio García Aguilar and daughter-in-law of Josefina Aguilar Alcántara. She learned the art form of clay-making from Josefina at the age of 16 years old, who encouraged her to pursue the craft. Alba received an honorable mention in ceramics from the Friends of Oaxacan Folk Art in 2013. In her art piece, she explored the relationship between humans and the earth, featuring icons such as butterflies and trees to represent nature. Her main concern that was reflected in her work is the state of the earth itself, and what will be left for future generations in such a destructive time.

== Fourth Generation ==
=== Fran García Vásquez ===
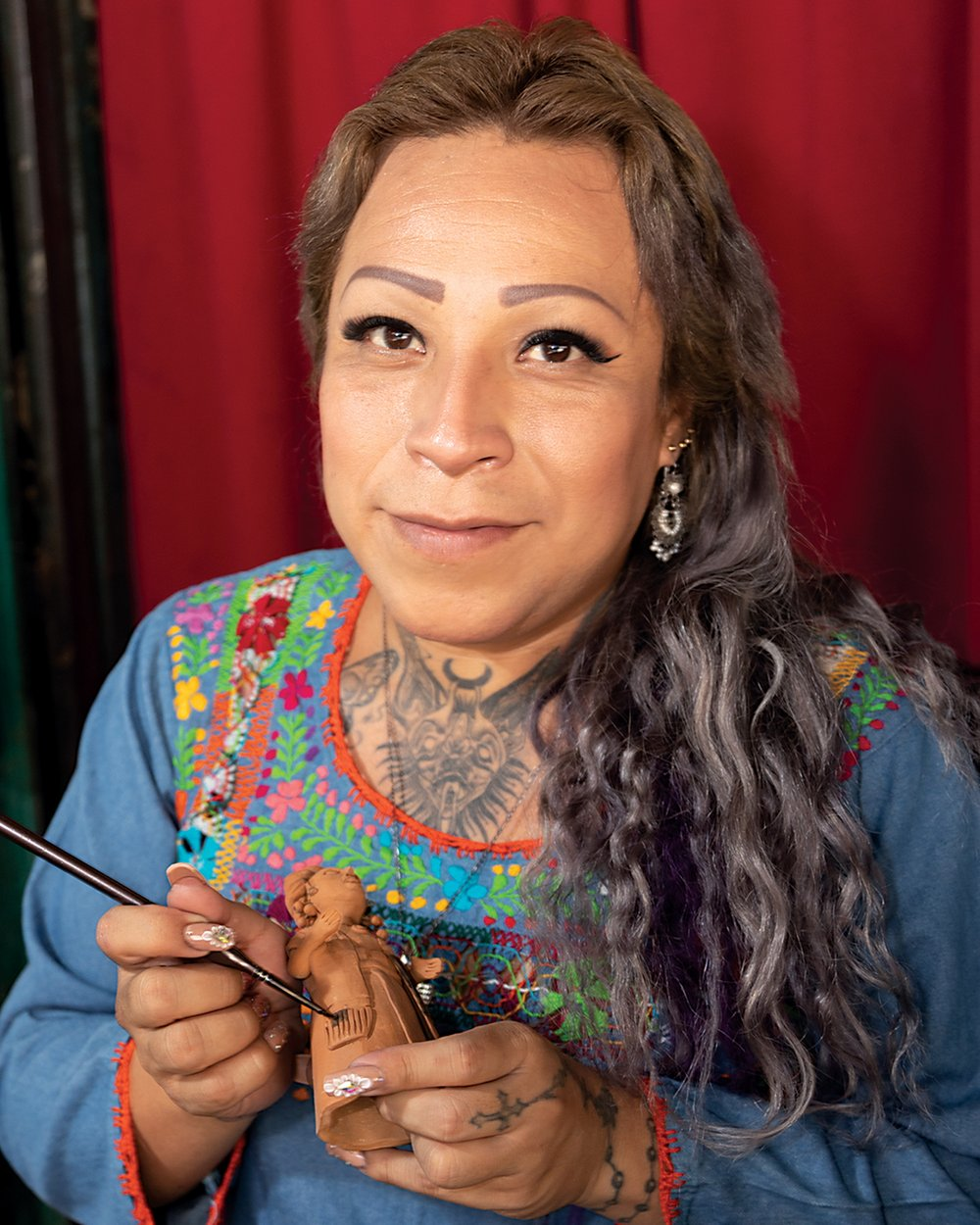
Photo of Fran García Vásquez

Fran García Vásquez, the daughter of Demetrio García Aguilar and granddaughter of Josefina Aguilar Alcántara, began her career in ceramics at a young age. She currently works as a multi-disciplinary artist, working with mediums such as ceramics and painting. Fran utilizes icons of Oaxacan culture, such as mermaids, saints, and cabaret ladies, as a means to explore gender roles in her work. She also depicts Muxes, an identity of Zapotec culture, in a modern expression as a way to preserve and continue its legacy.

Fran has received many accolades, including:

- Honorable Mentions from the Friends of Oaxacan Folk Art's contests in 2008, 2011, 2013, 2016, 2018, 2020 and 2022
- Exhibitor at the Museum of Natural History in 2018
- Speaker at the "IV International Colloquium on Women, Feminism, and Popular Art" in Mexico City in 2019
- Second Place in the Day of the Dead contest, organized by the Secretary of Culture and Fonart
- Second Place in Oaxacan Young Art contest "Jovenes de Excelencia 2022"
- Second Place in XXIII State Popular Art Prize "Benito Juárez" by the Institute, Promotion and Protection of the Crafts of the State of Oaxaca

=== Margarita García López ===
Born in 1998, Margarita is the daughter of Sergio García Aguilar and Alba Noemí López Zárate. She started working with clay at the age of 10 and from there began developing her own artistic practice. She noted that it is tradition to teach the children of the family clay-making; they are free to choose a different career path down the road, but must learn it regardless.

Margarita received honorable mentions in ceramics from the Friends of Oaxacan Folk Art's contests in 2011, 2016, and 2018. She also won third place in ceramics for FOFA's 2022 contest.

=== Jenifer García López ===
Born in 2002, Jenifer García López is the daughter of Sergio García Aguilar and Alba Noemí López Zárate. She learned to work with clay at a young age from both her parents and her grandmother, Josefina. Jenifer sold her first piece at the age of eight years old and continues the practice with her grandmother, usually working around four hours a day. Jenifer notes that she connects her work with her grandmother, as her grandmother first showed her at four years old how to work the clay. She draws inspiration from her feelings, the things around her, and her dreams. As of 2021, she is studying to be a nurse.

Jenifer received honorable mentions in ceramics from the Friends of Oaxacan Folk Art in 2022. She was a winner of FOFA's contests in 2016 and 2018.

== COVID-19 ==
The COVID-19 pandemic caused significant harm to the artisan community in Ocotlán de Morelos, as many of the artists relied on the tourists who made the journey to Oaxaca to buy their work. Due to isolation efforts to stop the spread of the virus, traffic decreased exponentially and halted any consistent income for the workers in the city.

In an attempt to assist the community, Alan Goldberg created an art competition: artists would make work centered around the COVID-19 pandemic and win money if they were selected winners. Goldberg, a decades-long patron of Oaxacan folk art, found the work to be so captivating that he created a book documenting the collection. Proceeds of the book became part of a fundraising effort for the artisan community of Oaxaca.

Many members of the Aguilar family were featured artists of the published book, Oaxacan Folk Art: Response to Covid-19.

Listed in published order:

- Concepción Aguilar Alcántara, daughter of Isaura Alcántara Díaz
- Demetrio García Aguilar, son of Josefina Aguilar Alcántara
- Guillermina Aguilar Alcántara, daughter of Isaura Alcántara Díaz
- Irene Aguilar Alcántara, daughter of Isaura Alcántara Díaz
- Jenifer García López, granddaughter of Josefina Aguilar Alcántara
- José Juan García Aguilar, son of Josefina Aguilar Alcántara
- Josefina Aguilar Alcántara, daughter of Isaura Alcántara Díaz
- Leticia García Aguilar, daughter of Josefina Aguilar Alcántara
- Margarita García López, granddaughter of Josefina Aguilar Alcántara
- Sergio García Aguilar, son of Josefina Aguilar Alcántara

The entire collection of art made for the competition was donated in 2017 to the Mexican Museum in San Francisco, CA.

== See also ==
List of Mexican artisans

== Museum Collections ==
- Art Museum of Southeast Texas, Beaumont, Texas
