= Apolinar Aguilar Velasco =

Mexican blacksmith

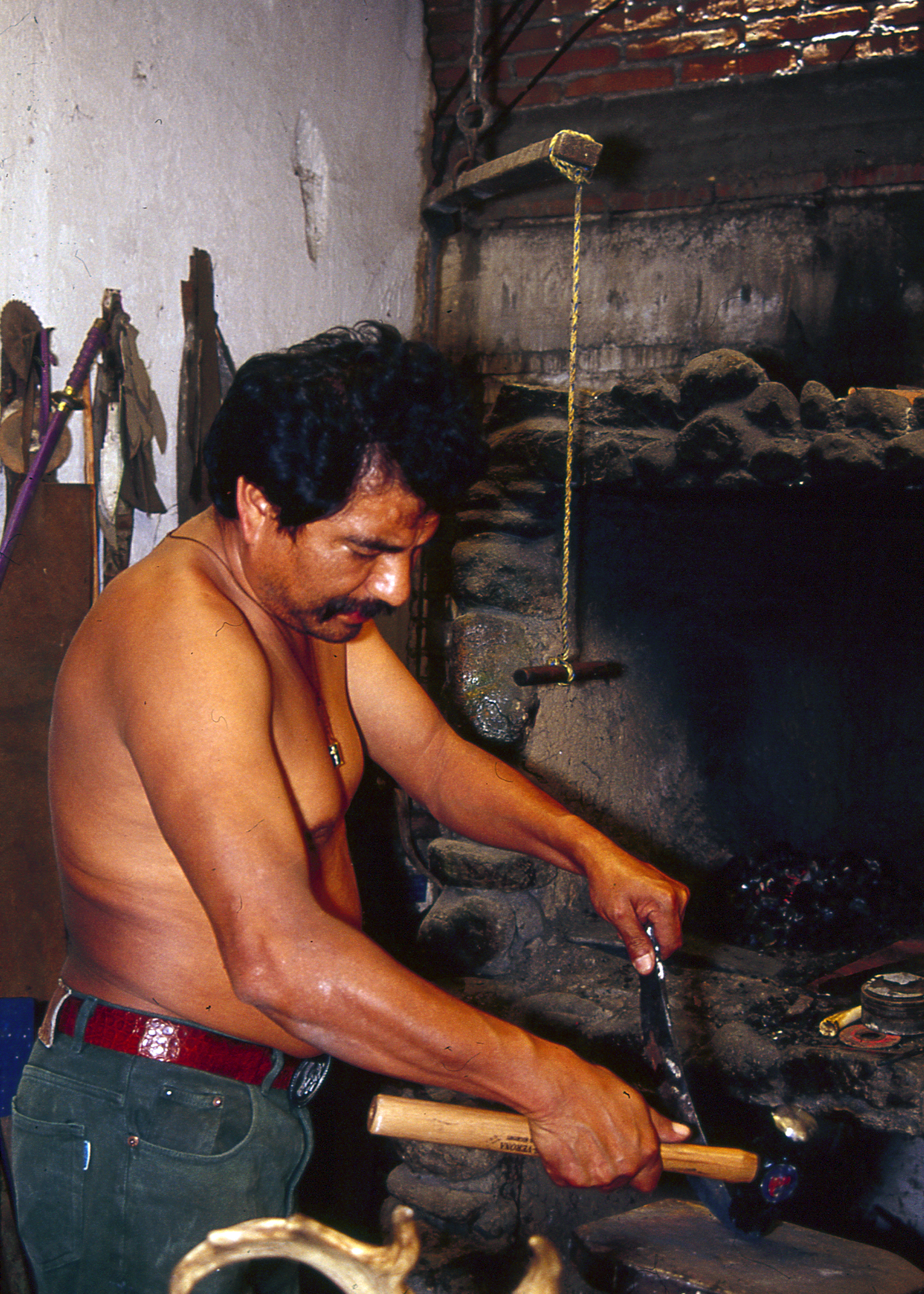
Apolinar working on a piece

Apolinar Aguilar Velasco is a traditional blacksmith who lives and works in the southern Mexican town of Ocotlán de Morelos, Oaxaca. Although there is a tradition of making blades in the town, the Aguilar workshop is the only one that still makes all pieces by hand, with no industrialization. The work of this craftsman, and that of his brother, Angel, have been used in movies. The workshop exports directly to buyers such as theaters, martial arts enthusiasts and collectors in both Mexico and the United States.

== Origin of workshop ==
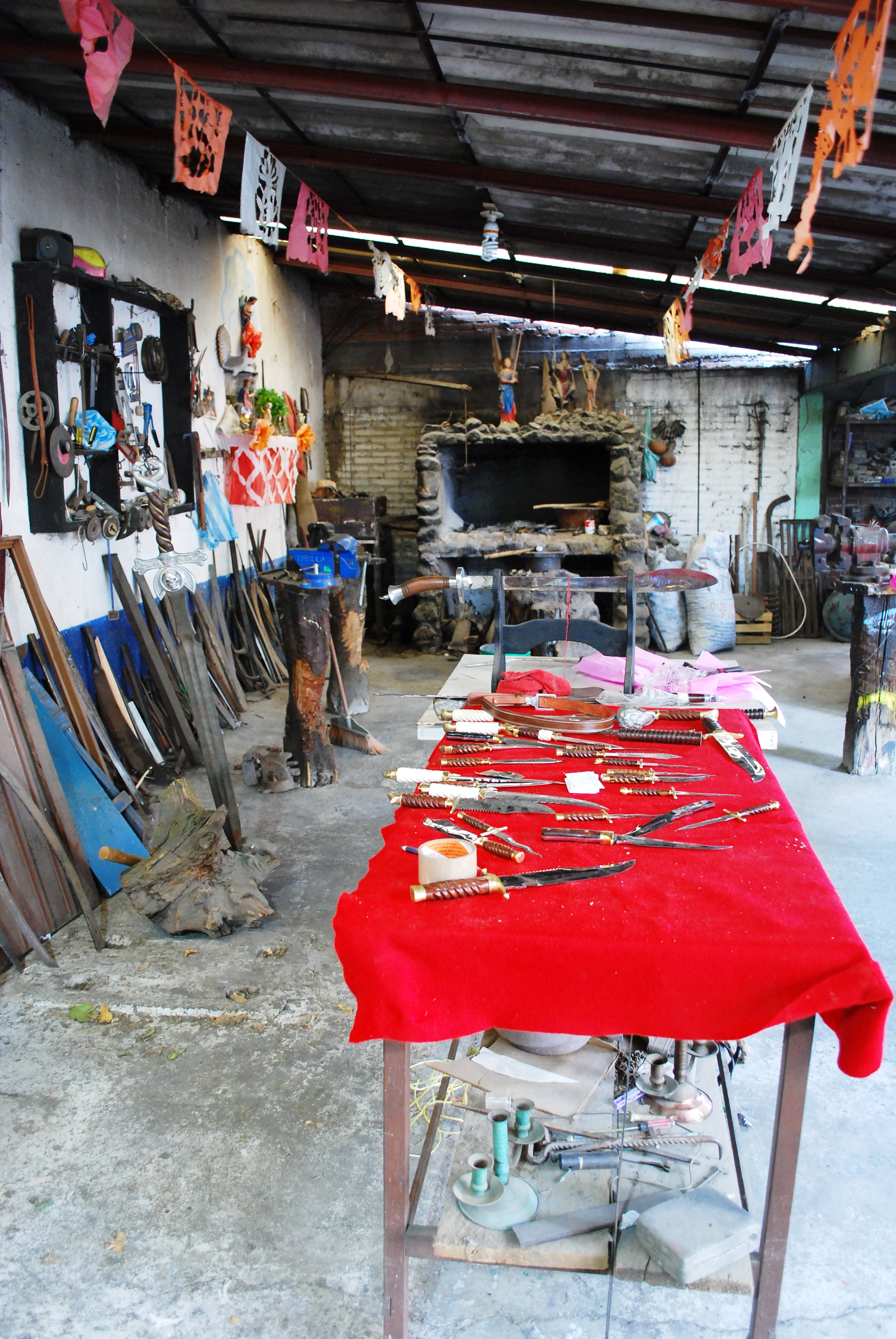
Family workshop with stone and brick furnace in the background

Aguilar Velasco was born and raised in Ocotlán de Morelos in the southern Mexican state of Oaxaca. This town is known for its handcrafts, especially pottery. There is also a tradition of blacksmithing. Apolinar and his brother Angel learned this craft from their uncle Ricardo Guzmán and formally established a workshop in 1970. The uncle died later in 1985, aged 110. Although Angel has since died, Apolinar continues the family tradition and has become even more well-known than his brother.

== Handcrafted steel ==
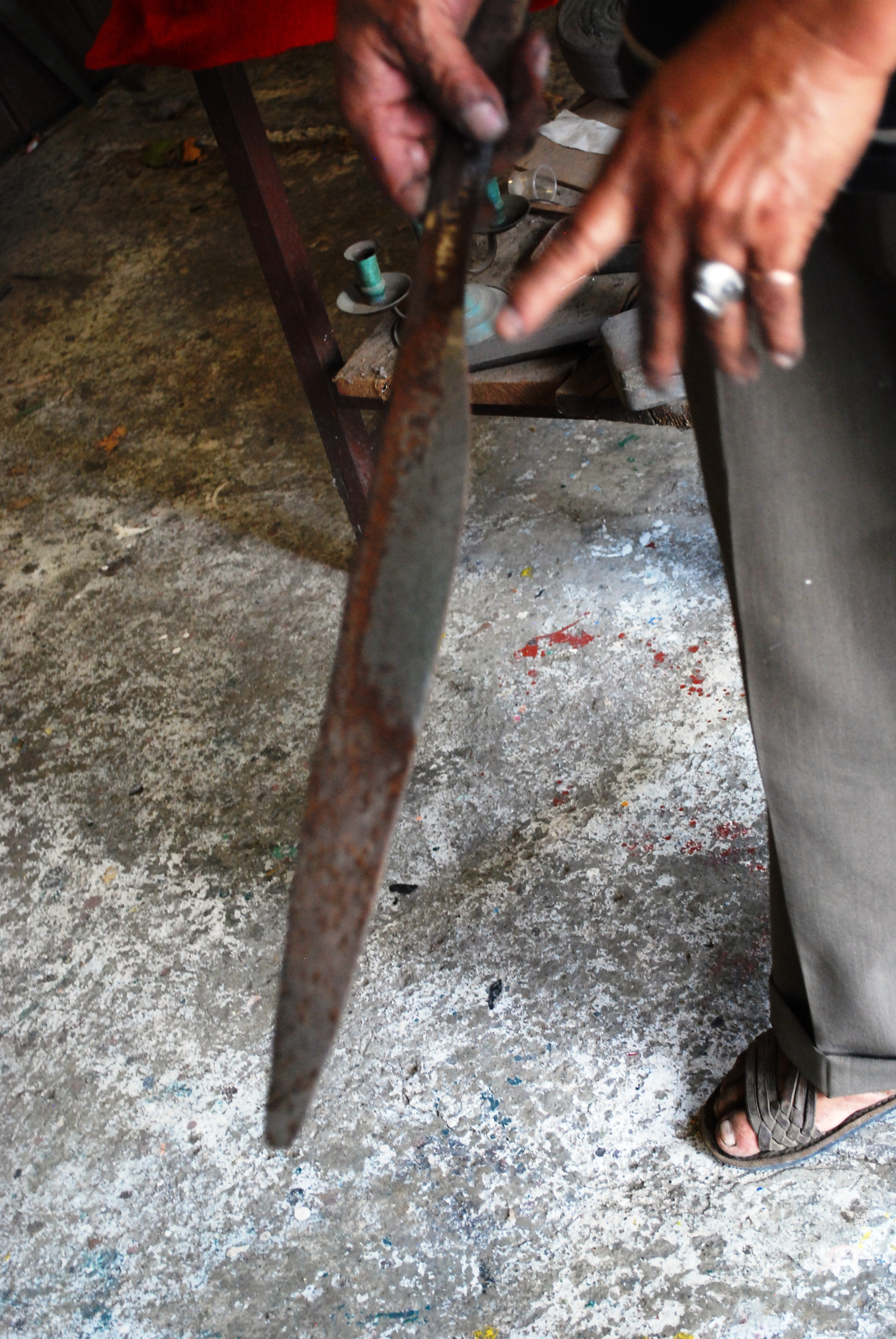
Partially worked machete

The Aguilar workshop is one of forty five which produce artistic blades, but it is the only one that still produces their pieces completely by hand, using traditional techniques, using hammers, anvils and a furnace made of stone and brick heated by hardwood charcoal. Each piece is unique in some way. The others have industrialized the production on one way or another, which Apolinar says makes the blades less expensive, but of poorer quality. Apolinar works with another brother by the name of Jesús Aguilar Velasco, and their base materials is scrap metal from autos and construction sites.

== The business ==
The workshop has provided blades to various clients. They popularly created and sold fully functional swords similar to the props famously made by Jody Samson and used by Arnold Schwarzenegger in the movies Conan the Barbarian and Conan the Destroyer. Particularly important pieces include one sold to Amalia Solórazo de Cárdenas, who then gave it to Mexican president Gustavo Díaz Ordaz, and swords for two movies. Apolinar and the workshop work with various shamans from Catemaco, Chiapas, Guatemala and Asia who order knives for ritual use. Their clients also include the Colegio Militar, theaters, martial arts enthusiasts, Boy Scouts, first responders and collectors in Mexico and the United States. The artisan sells directly and shuns intermediaries. The workshop is open to tourists who can see the processes of traditional blacksmithing. However, the trade has suffered from the fall in tourism to Oaxaca since 2006 and cheaper imports from China. Since 1986, The workshop has exported their blades on their own to the United States although recently it has been more problematic with tightening rules for weapons both in Mexico and the U.S. Apolinar has requested state and municipal authorities to support traditional metalwork but without success.

== See also ==
- List of Mexican artisans
- Apolinar Aguilar Velasco (Ocotlán de Morelos)
