= Josefina Aguilar =

Mexican folk artist (1945–2026)

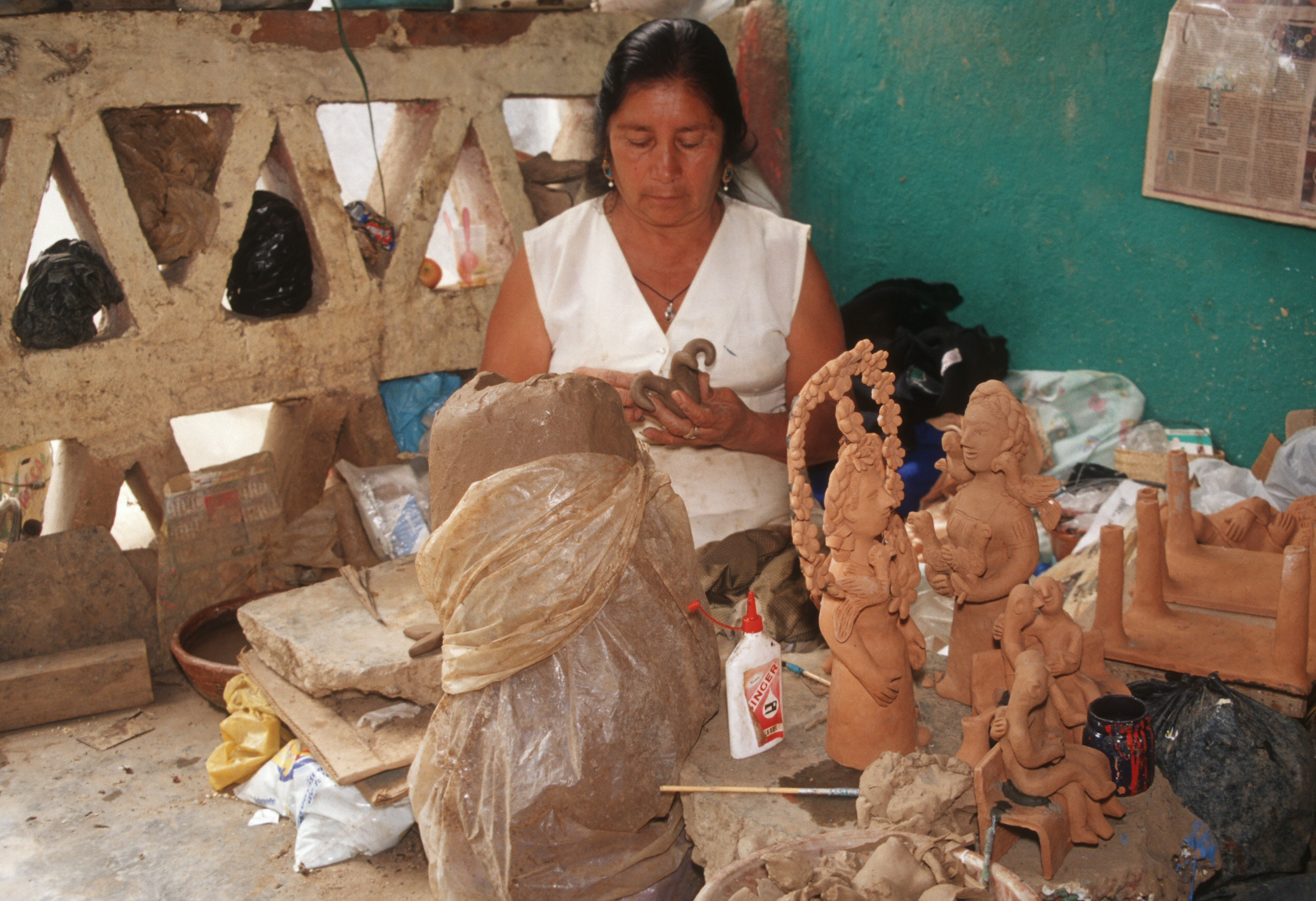
- Aguilar in her workshop
- Born: Margarita Josefina Aguilar Alcántara; February 22, 1945; Ocotlán de Morelos, Oaxaca, Mexico
- Died: February 13, 2026 (aged 80); Oaxaca City, Mexico
- Known for: clay muñecas (dolls)
- Style: Folk art

Margarita Josefina Aguilar Alcántara (February 22, 1945 – February 13, 2026) was a Mexican folk artist from Ocotlán de Morelos, Oaxaca. A member of the Aguilar family, she is best known for her small clay figurines called muñecas (dolls), an artform she learned from her mother. Aguilar uses red clay to create depictions of everyday village activities, religious and folkloric scenes, famous figures, and special Day of the Dead statues. Collectors of her work include Nelson Rockefeller, who discovered her work on a trip to Oaxaca in 1978, and San Diego folk art collectors Barbara and Lee Roper. Aguilar says each figurine she makes is unique. She became blind in 2014 and now uses touch to create her art. One of her major collectors quoted her as saying "It's not the eyes. It's the hand and the brain."

== Life and career ==
Josefina Aguilar was born in Ocotlán de Morelos, Mexico, on February 22, 1945. She was mentored by her mother Isaura Alcántara Díaz and her grandmother. She began learning her craft from them when she was six years old. Aguilar's mother died in 1968, at the age of 43. Her father died in 1976. In teaching her daughters, Aguilar's mother had hoped to pass on a craft and expertise that would provide for them. In her early twenties, Aguilar began to receive international press on her work. Aguilar's sisters Guillermina, Irene, and Concepción also became accomplished sculptors, each with their own specialties. By the beginning of the 21st century, Josefina Aguilar was the matriarch of a family with nine members working in clay, including her sons Demetrio and José Juan García. Other family members focus on painting or other tasks.

Aguilar died in Oaxaca City on February 13, 2026, at the age of 80.

== Process ==
Aguilar's family dig the clay they use from a pit in a field outside of Ocotlán de Morelos. To get the quality clay required they have to dig down 10 or 12 feet. They soak the clay, lay a palm mat over it, and walk on it to press out the bubbles. While sculpting, Aguilar sits on her heels on a flat stone. Finished figures have to dry indoors for a week (direct sunlight would cause them to crack) before the family fires them in a rustic wooden kiln for nine hours. Many figures are lost to breakage. Those that survive the firing process have to cool overnight before they can be painted. The Aguilars sell their artwork on trestle tables set up in the open courtyard of their five-family complex. Aguilar and her husband purchased the land where the clay for her work is sourced. Previously, the family paid weekly for the clay they used from this land.

== Work in museums ==
Josefina Aguilar's work is displayed in the Museum of International Folk Art in Santa Fe, the Mexic-Arte Museum in Austin, Texas, the San Antonio Museum of Art, the Mexican Museum in San Francisco, and the National Museum of Mexican Art in Chicago.

== Awards ==
In 1977 Aguilar won first prize in the third Gran Premio de Arte Popular (Grand Prize in Folk Art) competition held in Irapuato, Guanajuato, by the Instituto Nacional de Bellas Artes. In 1980 she won second place in the first Concurso Nacional de Objetos Navideños Tradicionales (National Traditional Christmas Objects Contest) held in Mexico City by FONART. In 2004 she won the Galardón Pantaleón Panduro in the Premio Nacional de la Cerámica (National Ceramics Prize) competition held in San Pedro Tlaquepaque, Jalisco.

== In other media ==
Children's book author Jeanette Winter has written and illustrated a counting book, Josefina (LCCN 95-34110), inspired by Aguilar's life and work.
