= Alan Goldberg (architect) =

American architect

Alan Goldberg is an American architect, best known for his gas station designs and his extensive participation in the field of hydrogen gas. He lives in New Canaan, Connecticut, with his wife.

Goldberg graduated from Washington University in St. Louis with a degree in architecture in 1954. From 1977 to 1991, he was a design consultant for Mobil Oil Corporation and created a program that affected about 20,000 stations world wide. Goldberg has been a visiting critic at the Harvard University Graduate School of Design and a design juror at the Yale University School of Architecture. Goldberg has also played a major role in the world of hydrogen gas as a member of the National Hydrogen Association. He is also known for his work on the American Airlines Terminal at John F. Kennedy Airport as well as the Seagrams Building.

In 2004, the School of Architecture at Washington University in St. Louis awarded Goldberg the "Distinguished Alumni Award."
