= Handcrafts and folk art in the State of Mexico =

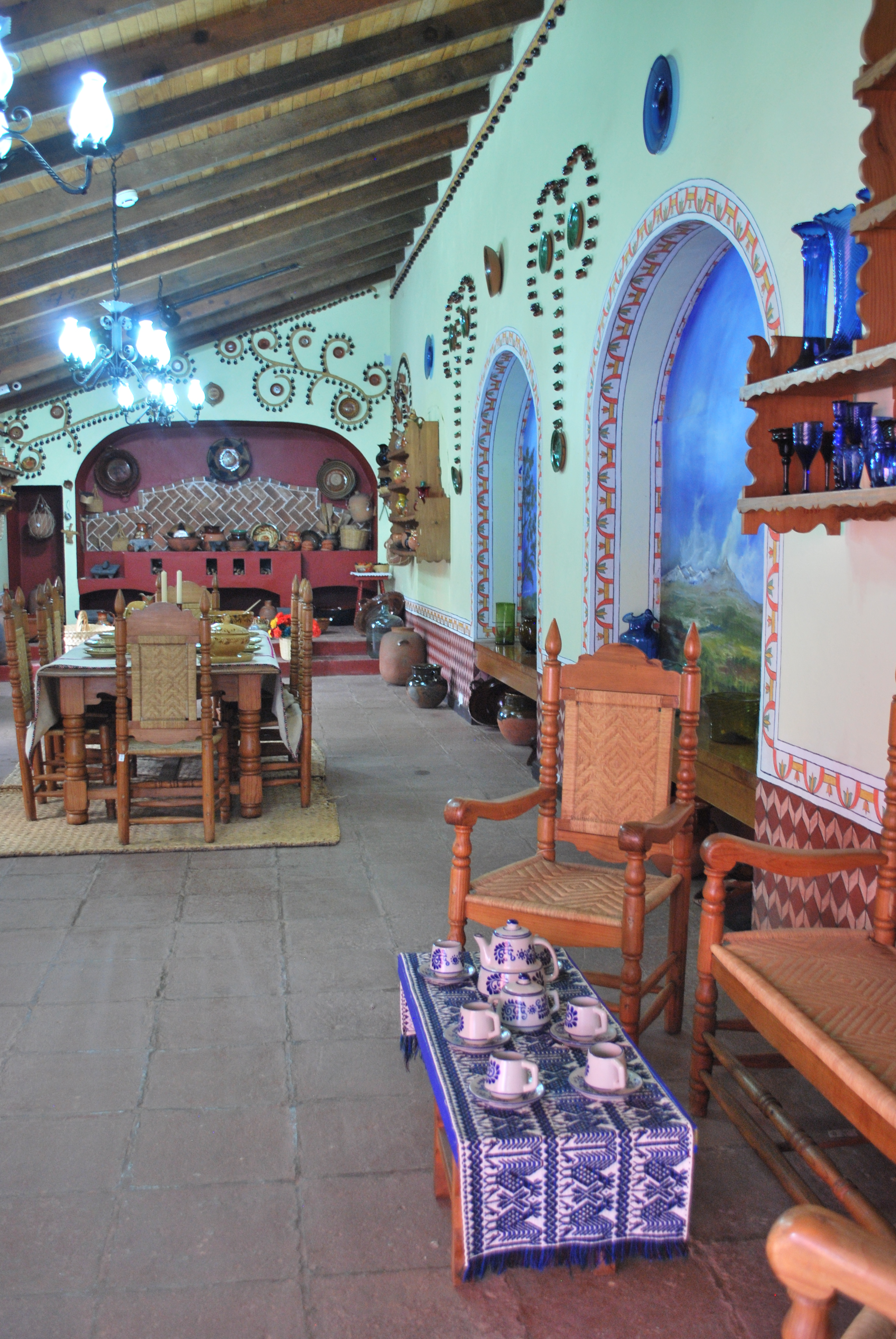
One of the display hall of the Museo de las Culturas Populares in Toluca

The Mexican State of Mexico produces various kinds of handcrafted items. While not as well documented as the work of other states, it does produce a number of notable items from the pottery of Metepec, the silverwork of the Mazahua people and various textiles including handwoven serapes and rebozos and knotted rugs. There are seventeen recognized handcraft traditions in the state, and include both those with pre Hispanic origins to those brought over by the Spanish after the Conquest. As the state industrializes and competition from cheaper goods increases, handcraft production has diminished. However, there are a number of efforts by state agencies to promote these traditions both inside and outside of Mexico.

== Types of handcrafts ==
=== Pottery ===
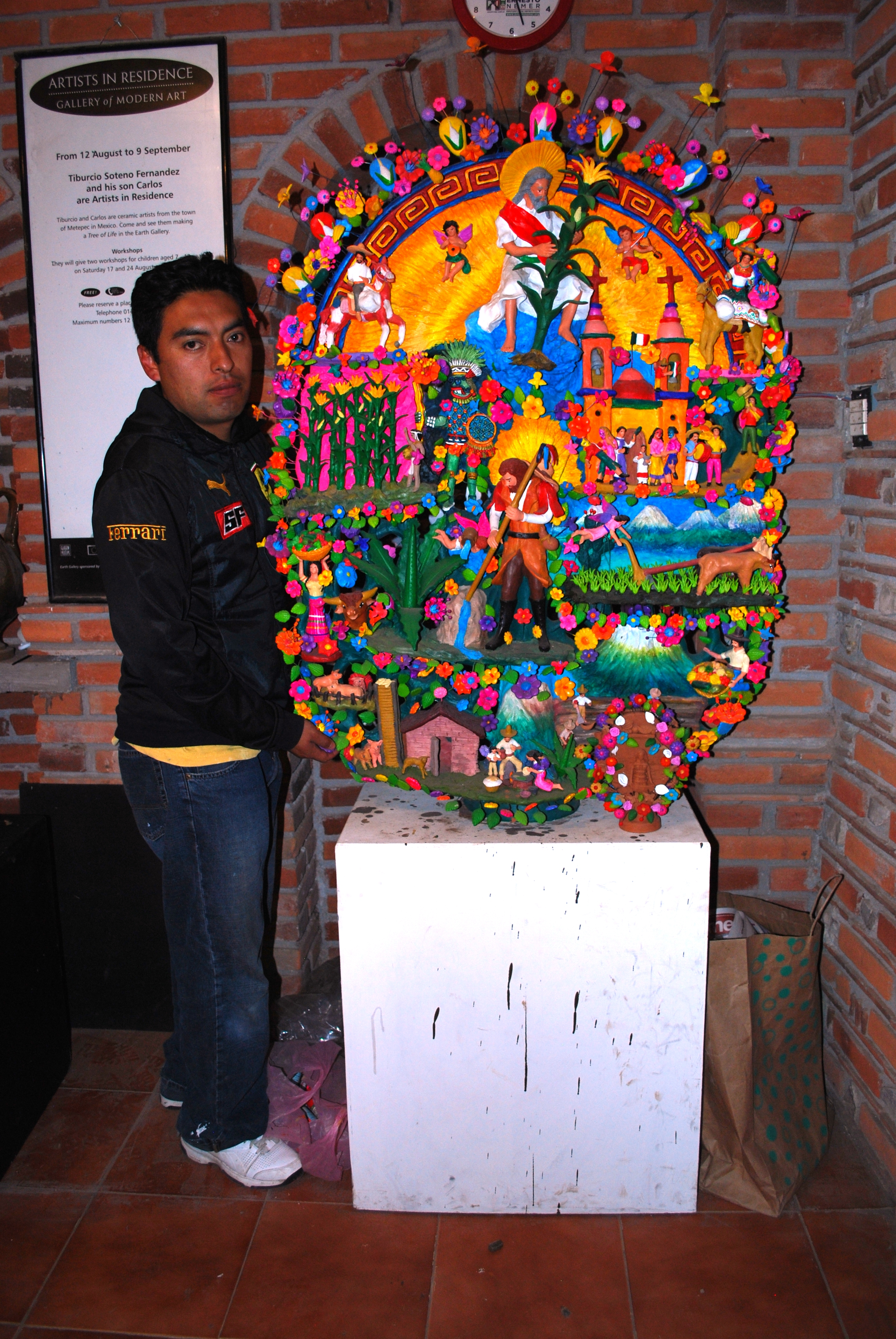
Carlos Soteno with one of his works at the family's Metepec workshop in Mexico

Pottery is the most commons handcraft and remains an important economic activity for the state, although most wares are still produced in the traditional manner, with little modernization or industrialization in technique. Pottery centers include Metepec, Tecomatepec, Valle de Bravo, Texcoco, Cuauhtitlan and Almoloya de Juárez, and common products include dishes, cups, decorative items and miniatures, such as toy dishes. Valle de Bravo makes sets of dishes and other pieces of glazed brown clay, and Texcoco creates reproductions of pre Hispanic pieces as well as newer pieces based on the old designs. Tecomatepec is noted for producing jars for serving pulque.

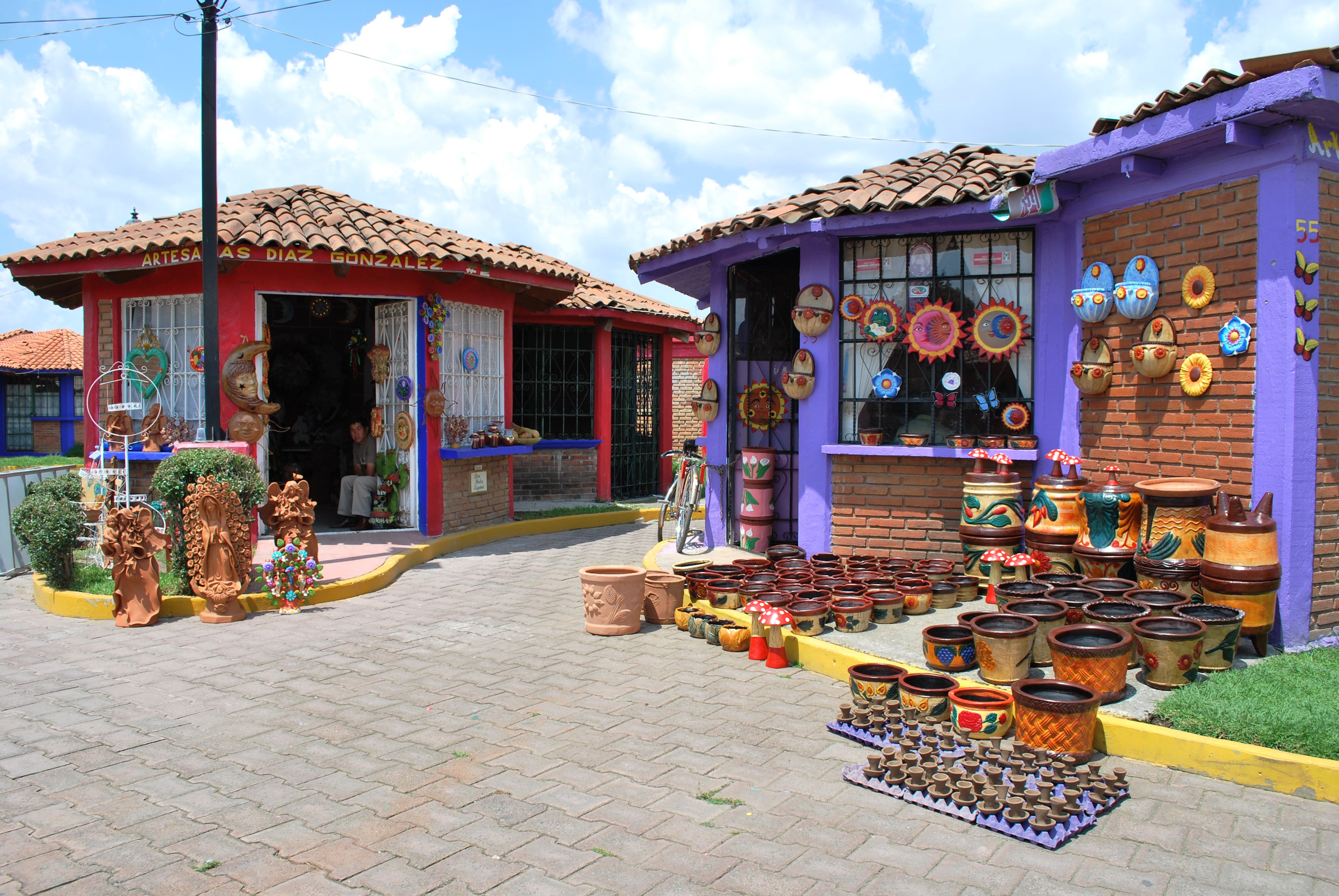
Shops with various pottery crafts in Metepec

Metepec is the state's main pottery center, with a production that stands out for its variety and artistry, which has evolved slowly since the colonial period. Although part of the Toluca metropolitan area, the center of this municipality maintains its small town atmosphere, with handcrafts filling stores and street stalls on the streets near the San Juan Bautista parish church. The municipality is home to over 300 artisans and 270 families dedicated in one way or another to this industry, which is its main economic activity. Most of the pottery produced is common glazed wares for everyday use such as large pots, plates and casseroles, often with a blue, green or yellow glaze. However, the municipality is better known for its decorative pieces, generally unglazed and painted tempuras in bright and contrasting colors. These include items such as nativity scene pieces, figures of horses, sun plaques (hung on the outside of houses) and mermaids, but the most notable decorative piece is called the “tree of life.” These look like candelabras which lack places to put candles. Traditionally these were made as allegories for the story of Adam and Eve in the Garden of Eden, and these continue to be made. More recently, trees with other themes have appeared including Day of the Dead, pottery making and more. These are low fire pieces, and most are small, no more than thirty cm in height, but monumental versions are made as well such as the one that is in the collection of the Vatican museums. Most are also painted in bright colors such as magenta, red, blue, yellow, green, orange and purple but some are left unpainted. In 2009, the Metepec style has been legally protected from imitations by denominación de origen.

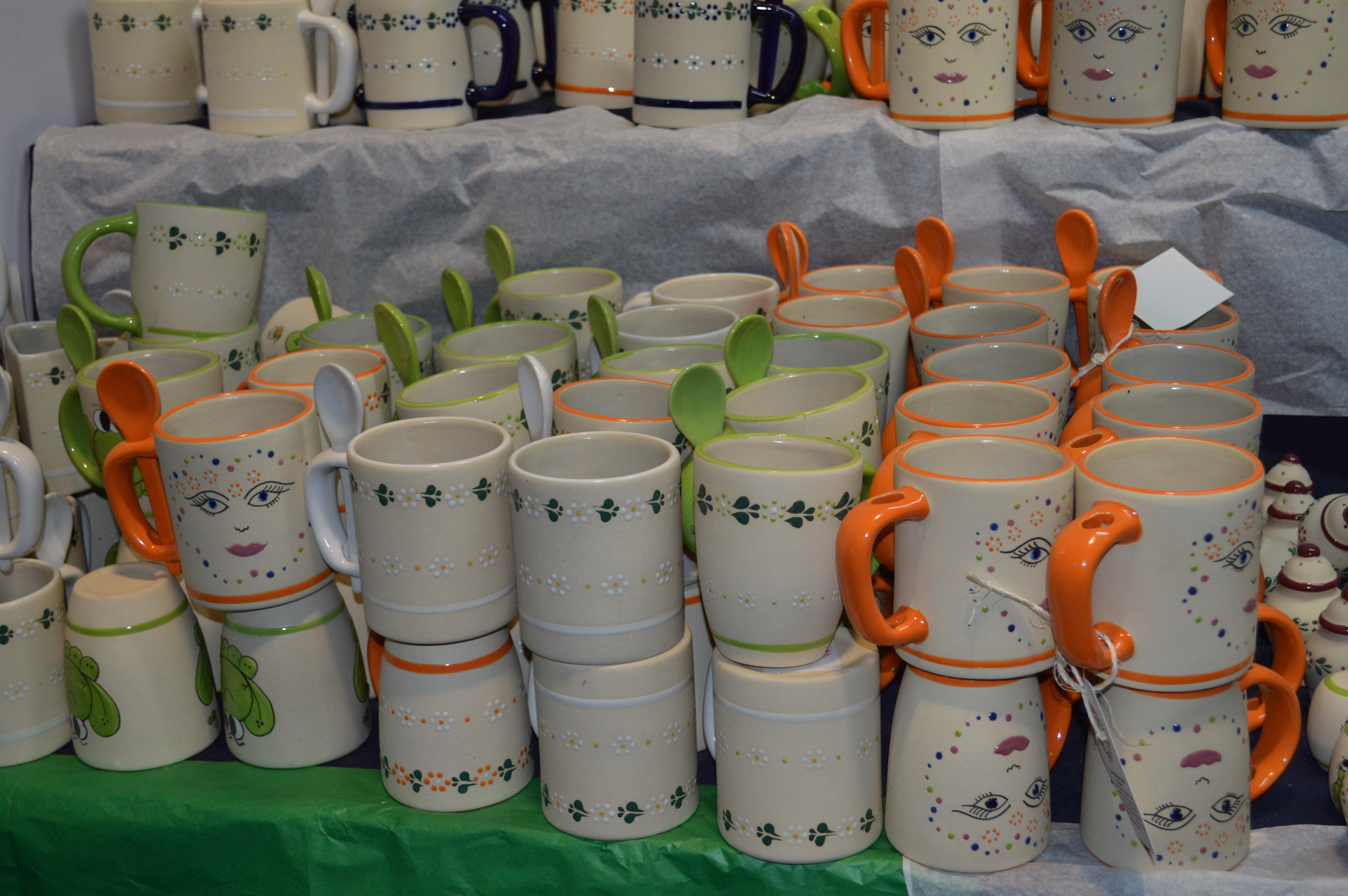
Wares from Temascalcingo

Temascalcingo makes high fire wares, a craft introduced during then governor Carlos Hank Gonzalez’s term to modernize production. It is distinguished by decoration in cobalt blue, based on traditional designs. In the community of Santa María Canchesda of this municipality, eight artisans, including two Mazahua, work to make high fire ceramics such as tea sets, shot glasses for tequila, bowls, flowerpots, napkin holders, fruit bowls, decorative figures, lamp bases and more.

=== Textiles ===
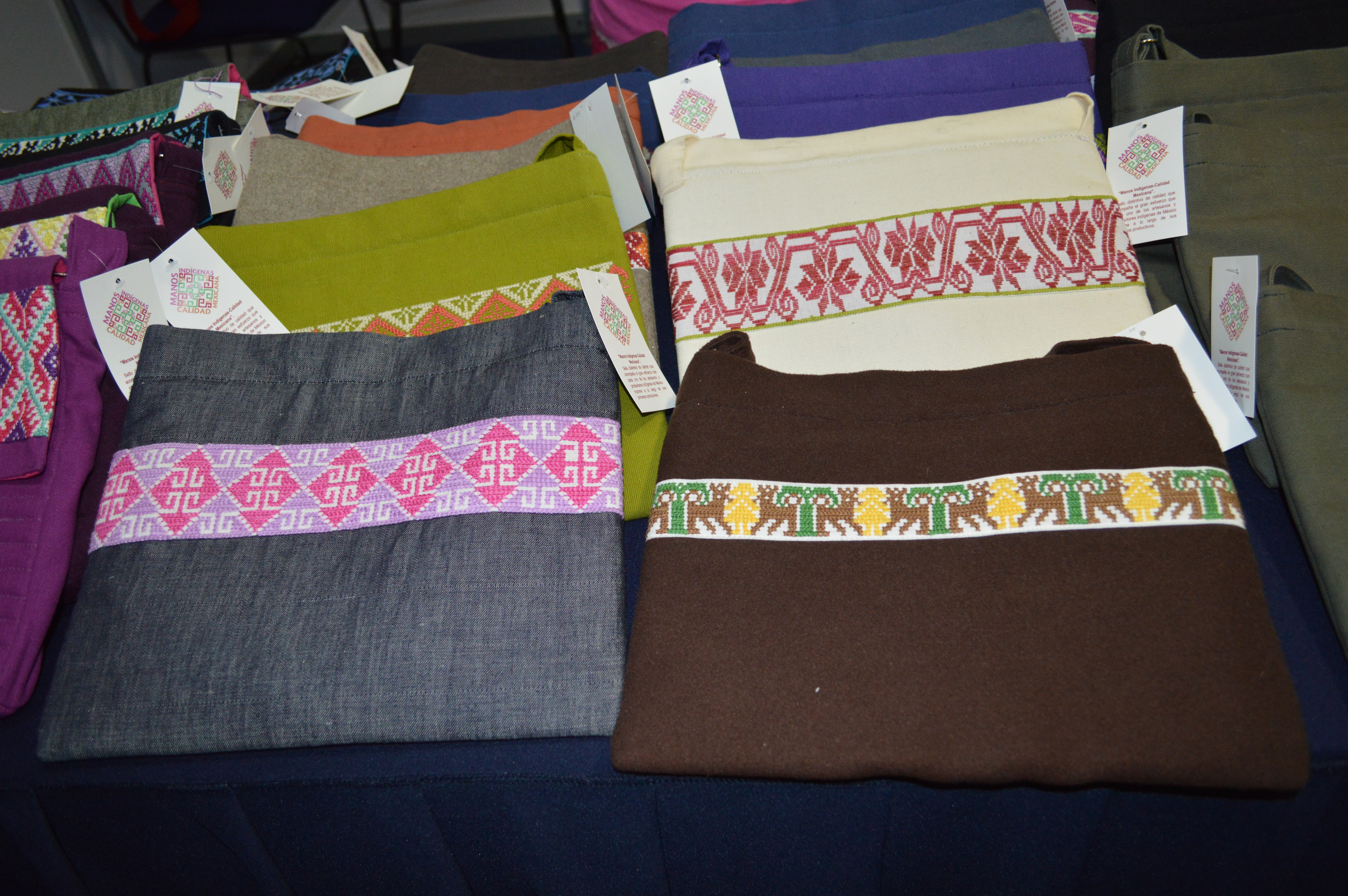
Shirts with Mazahua embroidery

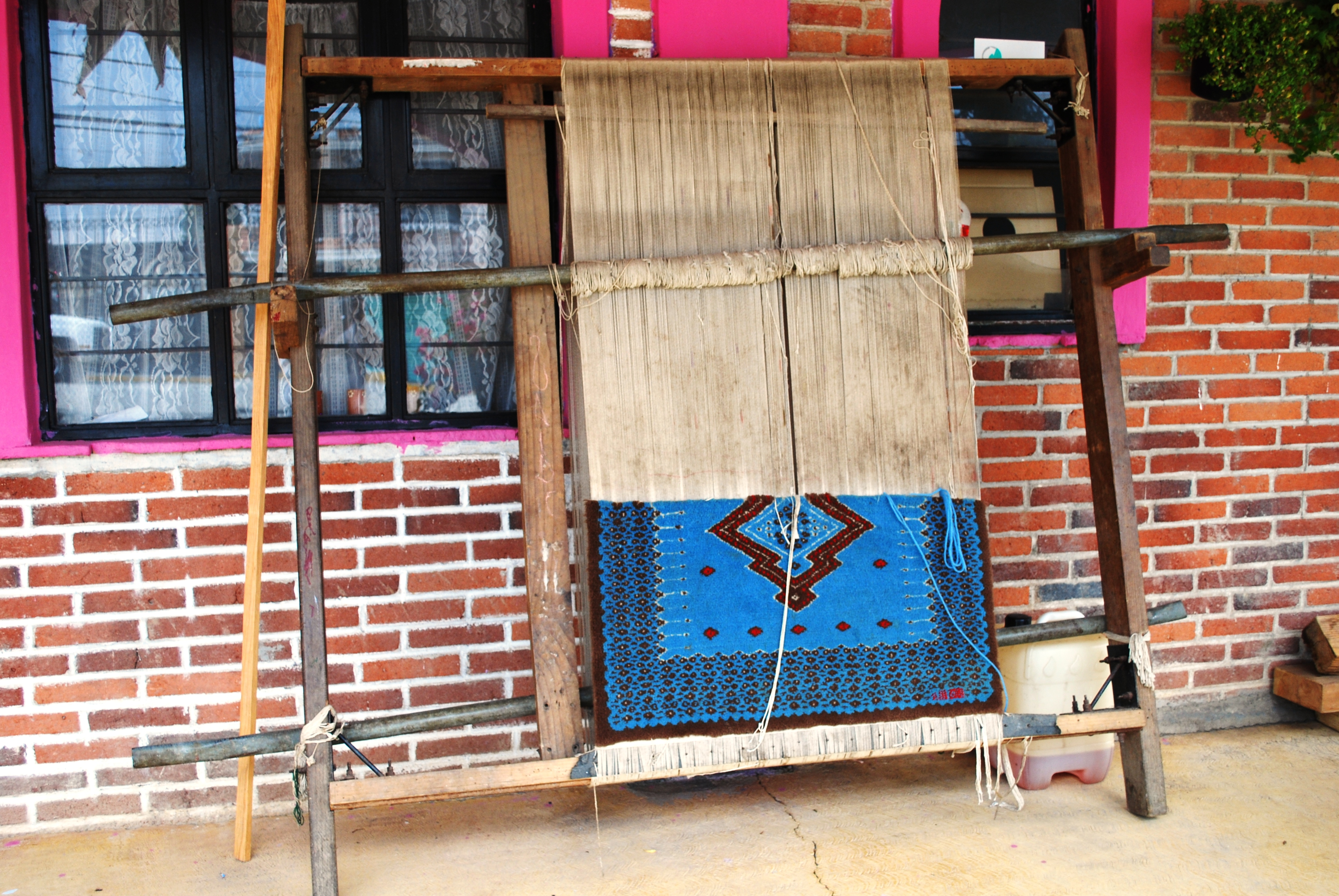
Knotted rug in progress at the rug cooperative of San Pedro Abajo, Temoaya

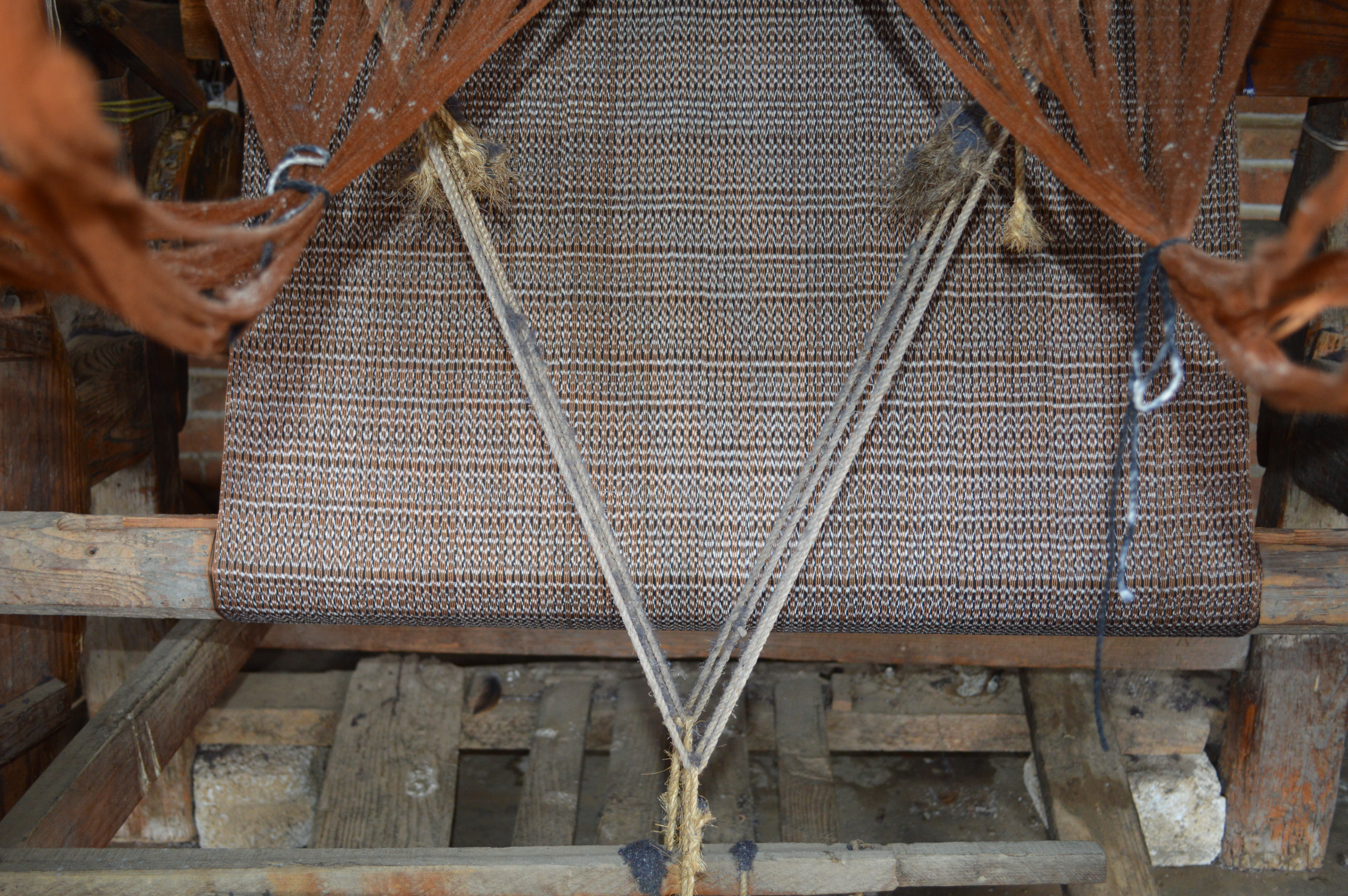
Calimaya design rebozo on loom at the Inocencio Balboa workshop in Tenancingo

The making of textiles in particular is both economic and cultural. Most is done in indigenous communities such as the Mazatecos, Nahuas, Mazhuas and Otomis, and have designs the identify wearers as part of those communities. The Otomis and Mazahuas are particularly known for their embroidery. Towns noted for their textiles include Jiquipilco, Tejupilco, Temascaltepec, Temoaya, Valle de Bravo, Zacazonapan, Toluca and Tenancingo. In general items such as napkins, tablecloths, sheets, curtains, blouses, aprons, sets for kitchen and bathroom, can be found along with rugs. Two traditional garments that are still seen include the poncho like quechquemitl, and a traditional shawl-type garment called a rebozo. In the State of Mexico, most woven pieces are wool or cotton/wool. Textiles include pieces woven from a cotton/wool mix, often decorated with multicolored flower and animal designs arranged geometrically on the cloth. The decorations used to have religious symbolism, but this as mostly been lost.

Weaving can be done on either a backstrap loom, mostly in indigenous communities or wood frame pedal looms, introduced by the Spanish in the colonial period. Xonacatlan and Ameyalco are two communities that still use the backstrap loom, with pedal looms used in communities such as Coatepec Harinas, Chiconcuac, Texcoco, San Felipe del Progreso, Xonacatlán, Guadalupita. Guadalupita, San Felipe del Progreso and Xonacatlan are particularly known for the making of serapes of naturally dyed wool in this manner.

The rebozo is woven in places such as Jilotepec, Tejupilco, Calimaya and especially Tenancingo. The work that goes into making the garments is generally divided among several artisans, specializing in a particular process: dying (especially if the ikat method is used), weaving and knotting the fringes. The rebozos of Tenancingo are made with commercial cotton thread and often tied with the ikat method to make traditional designs with names such as arco de Granada, flor de haba, labor doble, llovizna, palacios, venados, ratoncitos and coyotes.

Guadalupita (full name Guadalupe Yancuitlapan) is a small town which has been known for the making of wool garments for over 200 years. Weaving is used to make items such as serapes, bedcovers and overcoats, while knitting techniques are used to make sweaters, caps, gloves, stockings and more. The most traditional of these textiles are made from local wool, dyed, carded and spun by the craftsperson. However, this craft is dying out as the region becomes more industrialized and younger people go elsewhere to find work as the textile production pays too little.

In the Otomi town of Temoaya, the making of oriental style knotted rugs was introduced in 1969 as an initiative of the Bank of Mexico. While the making of these rugs is not native to the region, the native skills with textiles, especially knotting, lent itself to the craft. These rugs are made with indigenous and colonial era designs, with over 250 variants depending on colors and patterns. These rugs average 140,000 knots per square meter, made of 100% virgin wool over cotton threads, and take between fifteen and twenty days to complete a piece sixty by ninety cm.

=== Wood ===
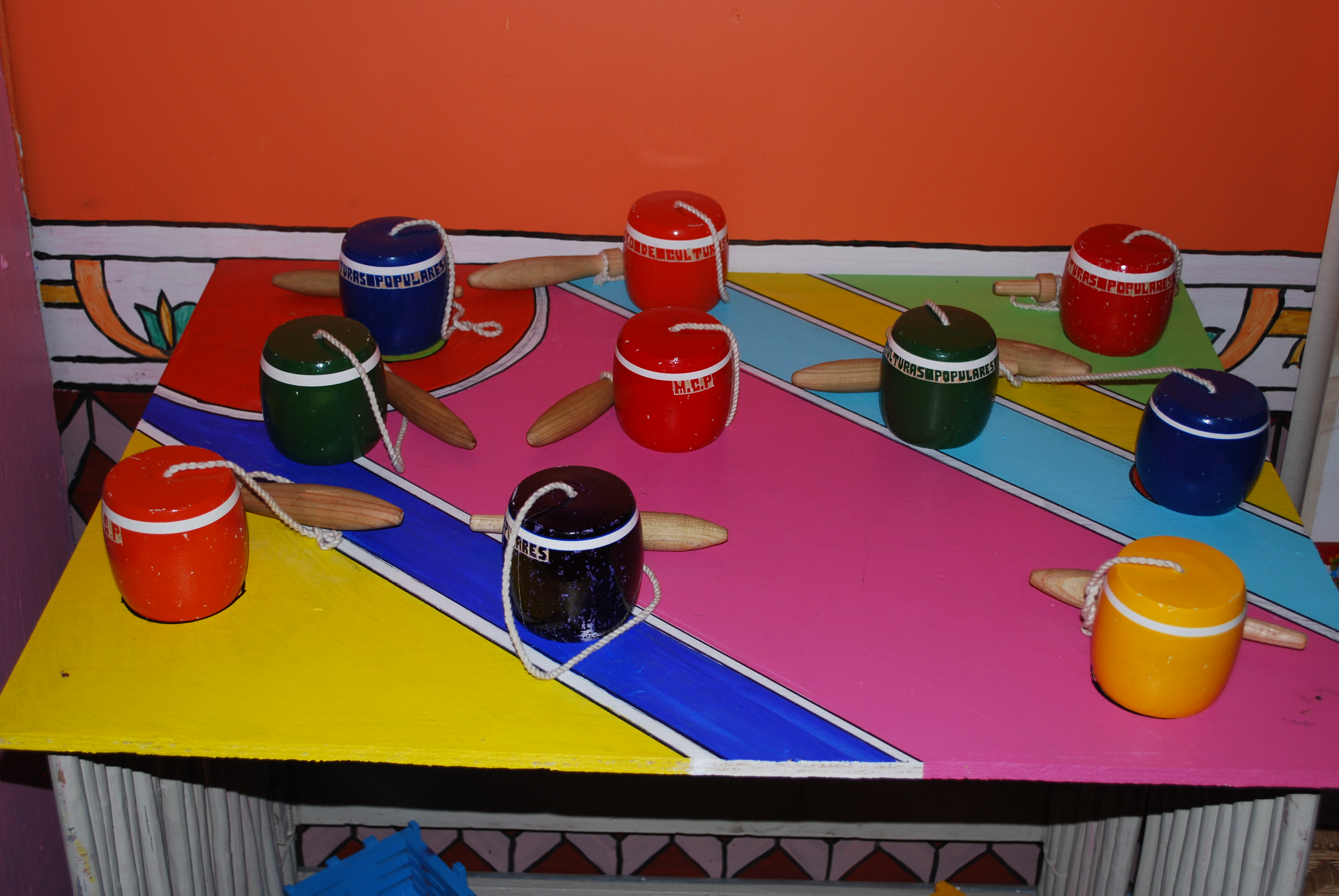
Wood toys at the Museo de Culturas Populares

Wood is most often used to create furniture, in both traditional (esp. rustic colonial) and modern designs. The community of San Pedro Tultepec in the municipality of Lerma is noted for its production of handcrafted furniture, ranging from rustic colonial to modern European designs. This production began in the late 1980s and has grown to over 100 workshops, which often create pieces to order. Most pieces are made from pine, but finer furniture is also made from other woods, including cedar. These workshops are family owned with younger members learning from older.

Another area noted for wood products is San Antonio la Isla, often using local materials. Here smaller items such as tops, ball-in-cup, yoyos and toy cars are made in wood along with utilitarian and decorative items for the home. It is the principal economic activity of the municipality, occupying about sixty percent of the population.

=== Metal working ===
Traditional metal working is found in Ecatepec, Naucalpan, Tecamac, Texcoco, Jiquipilco, Toluca and El Oro, working copper, brass and tin with some pewter work as well. These are mostly worked into decorative items with rustic designs. The small community of Cacalomacan, just outside Toluca, works tin, brass and copper using the most traditional methods. This was introduced by the Spanish to make both decorative and utilitarian items. Today it is mostly used for the former to make railings, balconies and furniture. In the State of Mexico smiths of this type can be found in various parts of the state such as Chalco, Jocotitlan, Toluca, Valle de Bravo and Ecatepec.

Silversmithing is a notable activity for the state, with both hammering and filigree technique used. The best known work is done by the Mazahuas, centered on the town of San Felipe del Progreso. The main product is a kind of heavy hoop earring, with designs of flowers, butterflies and birds, commonly seen on Mazahua woman as they have cultural significance. Silversmiths from this community won one of their first international recognitions at the World Silver Fair in 1974. In addition to the Mazahua, Tejupilco produces necklaces of hollow silver beads that ends in a locket. Silver is also worked in Naucalpan and Nezahualcóyotl to make bells, sculptures, jewelry and more.

=== Fireworks ===
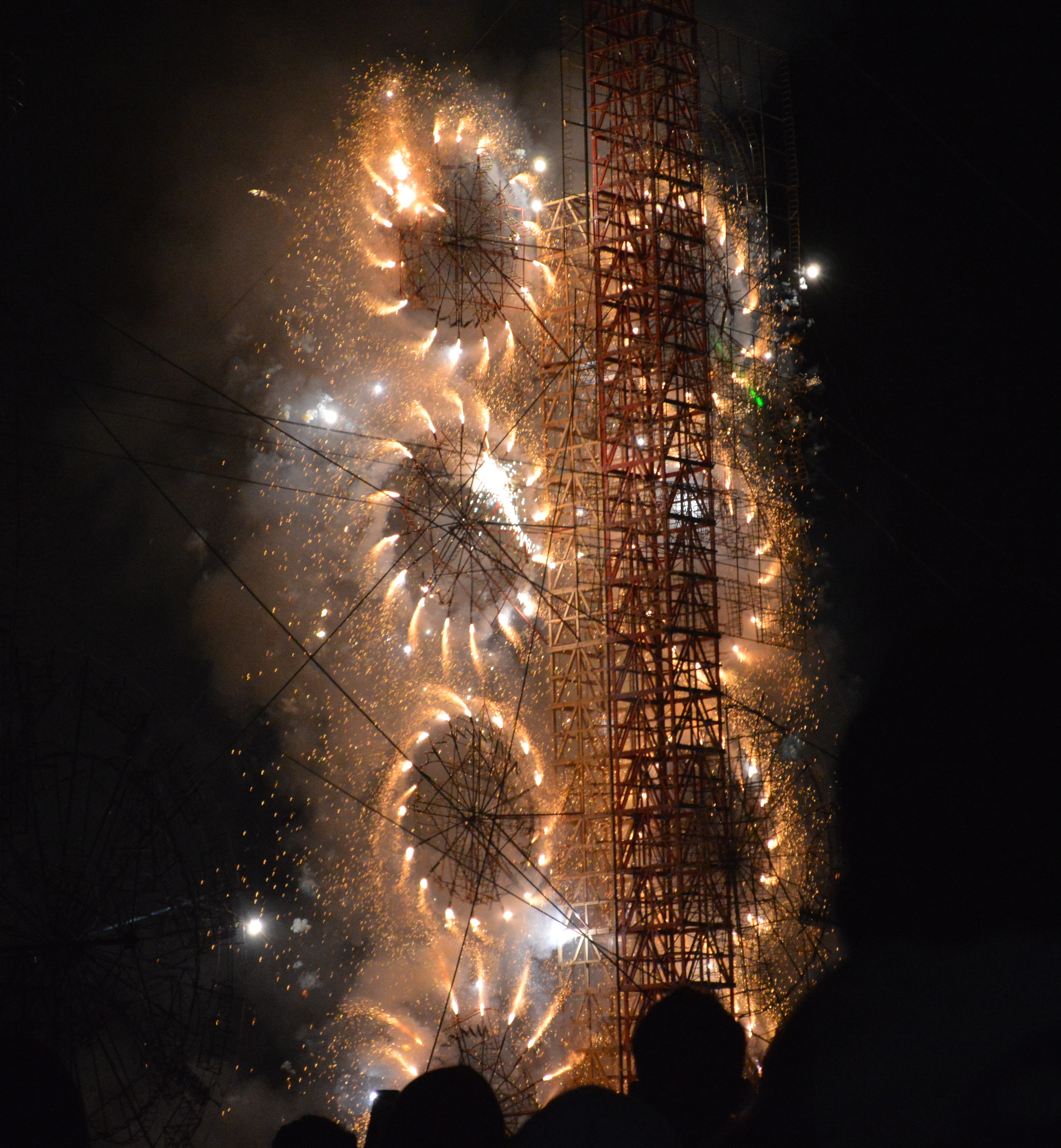
Fireworks "castle" at the Feria Nacional de Pirotecnia in Tultepec

The making of fireworks is distinctive in the state, especially in the municipalities of Tultepec, but they are also produced in Almoloya de Juarez, Axapusco, Tianguistenco, Tenancingo, Tenango del Valle, Otumba, Capulhuac, Coyotepec, Tecamac and Texcoco. One traditional use for firecrackers and small rockets is to place them on frames such as small bulls (toritos), small to very large freestanding structures called castles (castillos) and onto large paper mache figures traditionally to represent Judas Iscariot on Holy Saturday. Fireworks are sold year round, used for many celebrations such as patron saints’ days but the biggest season is Independence Day.

=== Other crafts ===
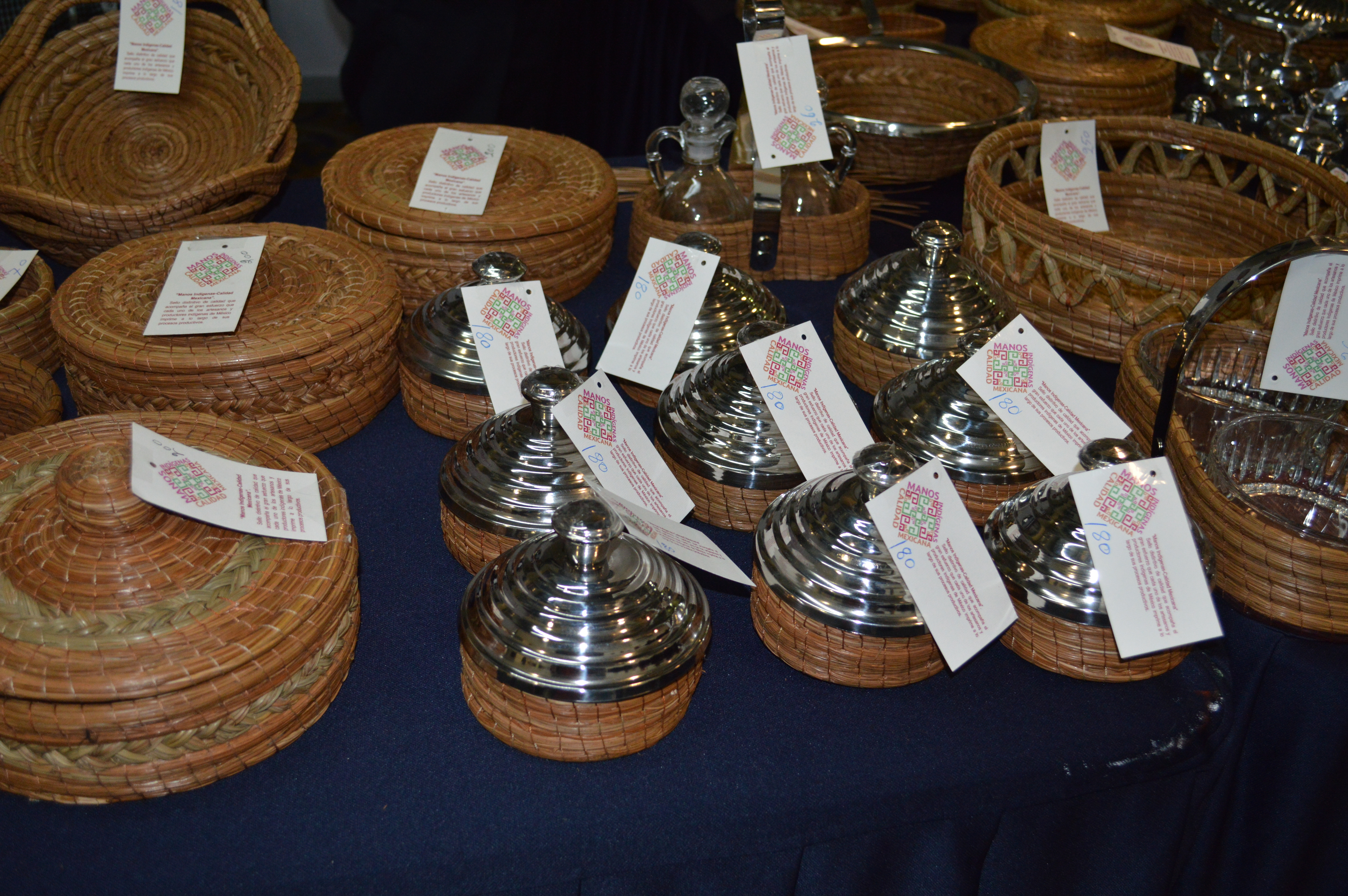
Basket items made with long pine needles from El Oro

Glass work is mostly done though blowing techniques to make decorative objects, bells, flowers and more. Texcoco is one of the few places in Mexico where this is produced using traditional techniques and division of labor. One famous factory was founded by Antonio Derfingher in 1948. Born here and descended from glass blowers, the maestro has since died but the factory still survives making stem glasses, water glasses, ashtrays, fruit bowls, flower vases and more.

Sandstone is one stone worked traditionally, with hammer and chisel, in the state, with one of the main products being gravestones. These are made in various parts of the state, but especially in Amecameca and Zacualpan. They also make religious figures and other kinds of sculptures with it. Teotihuacan, San Martin de las Piramides and San Francisco Mazapa are noted for work in obsidian and onyx. In Chimalhuacan, Acambay and Toluca, rough volcanic stone is worked in to molcajetes and metates, along with sculptures, columns, fountains, along with human and animal figures.

Handcrafted waxworks mostly focuses on decorative and scented candles. Decorative candles are those surrounded by sculpted wax decorative elements, which can overwhelm the actual candle itself. These elements come in a wide variety of shapes and colors, and the pieces are created for special events, often religious. In the State of Mexico, these are mostly made in Amecameca, Tenango del Valle and Toluca.

Traditional candies are still handmade and hand formed into various shapes, often for holidays. These are generally made of fruit and sugar of a pure sugar paste. Some elements are from the pre Hispanic period but it is mostly of European origin. Toluca is best known for this work, followed by Amecameca, Ixtapan de la Sal, Ocoyoacac, Villa Guerrero, Tenancingo, Malinalco and Zacualpan. The main season for these sweets in Day of the Dead (November 2), when skulls, bones and many other shapes are sold, especially at the annual Feria del Alfeñique, dedicated to this craft.

Crafts based on paper products can be found in Acolman, Metepec, Toluca, Huixquilcan, Nezahualcoyotl and Otumba. The making of paper in this region dates back well into the pre Hispanic period, when it was mostly used in the making of codices. Today the most common product is papel picado (lit. pricked paper), where holes are cut into crepe paper to make designs and hung as decorations for special occasions.

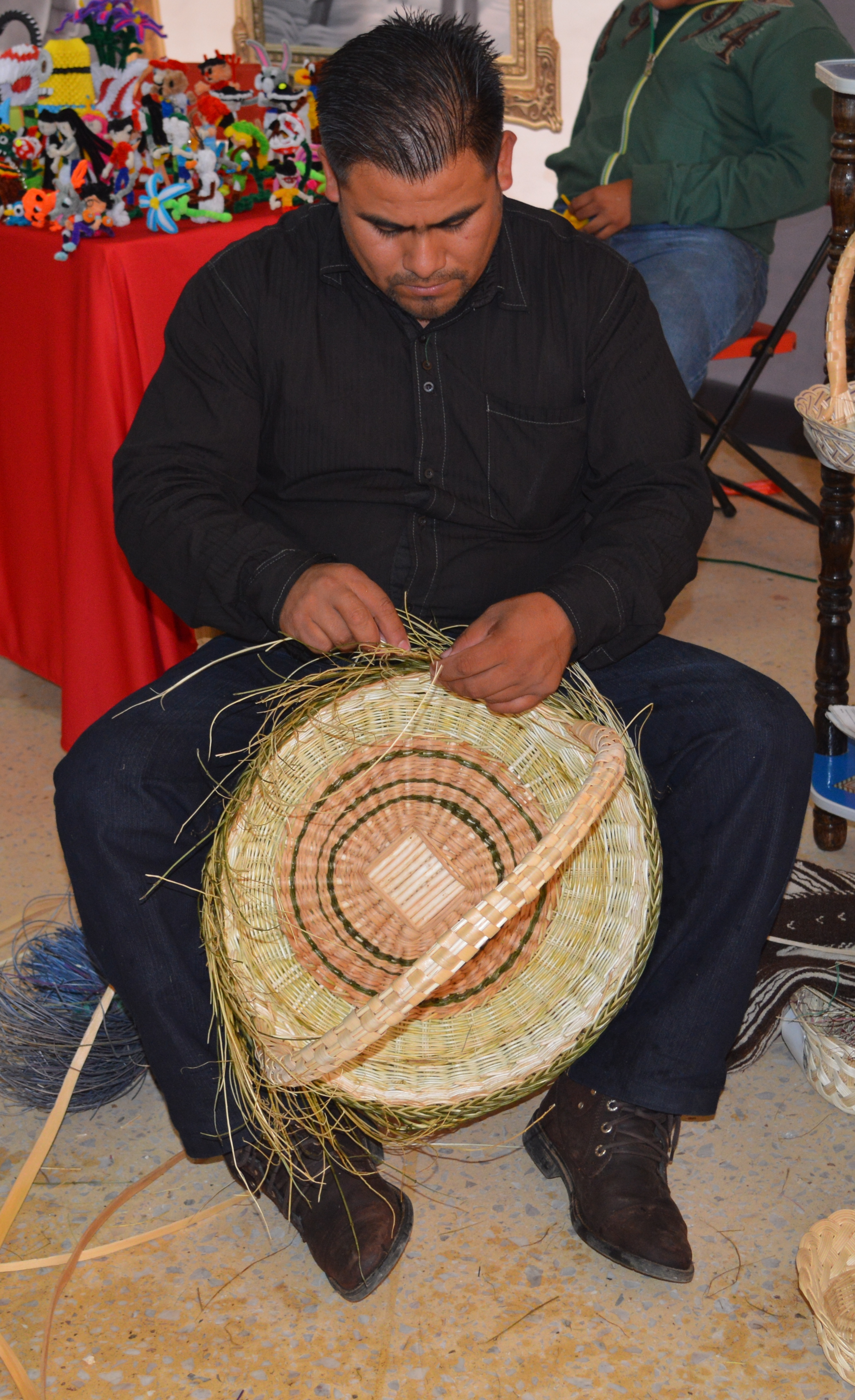
Member of the Apolinar Hernandez Balcazar family making a basket at the Feria de Rebozos in Tenancingo

Stiff vegetable fibers such as reeds are used to make hats, mats and more in addition to baskets for carrying and storage. Most artisans of this type are indigenous and is most commonly done in Jiquipilco, Temascalcingo, Tenancingo and Toluca (in the San Andres Cuexcontitlan and San Cristobal Huichochitlan neighborhoods), where they produce tortilla holders, bags, placemats and more. The use of dyed fibers woven into patterns is a common decorative technique. Most of the designs are passed down from generation to generation. There is also basketry done in Amanalco, Donato Guerra and El Oro, distinguished with ornaments of high fire ceramic, brass and glass.

Leather is worked into belts, bags, jackets, briefcases, chests, huaraches, wallets and other items, mostly utilitarian. The pieces are worked with leather from cows, pigs, sheep and goats and often include other materials such as ixtle thread (piteado), bone buttons and iron clasps. Towns noted for this work include Amatepec, Toluca, Coacalco, San Mateo Atenco, Mexicaltzingo, Tenango del Valle, Tejupilco, Sultepec and Villa del Carbon.

Animal horn and bone are worked into a number of objects in the municipalities of Rayón and San Antonio la Isla to create combs, hair trusses, chess pieces, whistles, necklaces, earrings, keychains and more. One very important item is buttons for charro suits generally made from horn.

The art of feather working has nearly died out because of the overexploitation of the primary material. However, some is still done in Ecatepec, La Paz, Rayon, San Martín de las Piramides, Teotihuacan, Tepotzotlan and Toluca.

== History ==
The handcrafts of the state include those which have origins in the pre Hispanic period, and which maintain techniques and aesthetics from that period to at least some extent. After the Conquest, the Spanish introduced new techniques and styles to existing handcrafts and introduced completely new products such as blown glass.

In the pre Hispanic period, the best pottery makers in what is now the State of Mexico were the Matlatzincas, whose work was influenced by that of the Nahuas, producing urns, pots, incense burners, cups and plates. However, it was not as brilliant or as fine as the pottery produced in Cholula or Tenochtitlan. In the colonial period, pottery did not disappear, like some other indigenous crafts, but was radically changed. European techniques were introduced, such as glazing, along with both European and Oriental decorative designs.

The Spanish introduced the working of brass, iron, tin, bronze and steel. During the pre Hispanic period, the working of fine metals such as gold, and to some extent silver, developed to make luxury good for the elite. During the colonial period, the indigenous were forbidden to work fine metals but this was lifted in the 18th century, acknowledging that the prohibition was ineffective. However, the clandestine working of silver allowed traditional techniques and designs to be conserved.

Basket making in the state developed near rivers and lakes where reeds grow, such as the banks of the Lerma River. This craft remains an indigenous activity almost entirely.

Much of the labor supply of colonial State of Mexico into the 19th century was focused on production in and production for the various haciendas, including handcraft production. From the 19th century on, with the rise of modern industry, handcraft production began to diminished as mass-produced goods were cheaper, and factory work provided better wages. This industrialization of the state continues. In addition, the competition of Asian wares has further diminished traditional handcraft production.

== Socioeconomic importance ==
The state is home to seventeen recognized handcraft traditions, and artisans who have been recognized nationally and internationally. However, most artisans work in anonymity and the work of the state has been little studied, with the exceptions of Mazahua textiles and the tree of life. The latter is recognized internationally with examples in museums such as the Casa de las Americas in Havana. A series of state handcrafts, including trees of life, jewelry, baskets and more are part of the collection of the Vatican museums.

State of Mexico handcrafts generate between eight and ten million pesos in annual sales. There are 120,000 artisans, with about 25,000 registered with the state agency Instituto de Investigación y Fomento de las Artesanías. Only about 100 artisans have large enterprises.

Most of the sales and exposure of these handcrafts is done through state sponsored stores called Casart, which has eight branches in the State of Mexico, with the main Casart store in Toluca on Paseo Tollocan. Sales are on consignment with the price dictated by the artisan. Another important institution is the Museo de Culturas Populares, part of the Centro Cultural Mexiquense, which is located on the former site of the main house of the La Pila Hacienda. It houses a collection of the handcrafts of the state, including a giant tree of life which was constructed at the museum in 1986.

Other efforts to promote these handcrafts include the sending of a tin and ceramic nativity scene along with other items as a gift to the Pope in 2009, Later the state made an agreement with the Vatican museums to sell state handcrafts at their outlets and others nearby. In 2013, handcrafts were sent to Laredo for the Sister Cities International Festival to help open the US market, and in 2014, an exhibition of the state's handcrafts was held at the Mexican Senate. The state sponsors an annual handcraft festival called the Fiesta Artesanal Mexiquense, and in 2015, established the first contest for fireworks manufacture called the Concurso de Artesanía Pirotécnica. The state has also worked to get treaties to allow the export of its handcrafts exported to countries such as Spain, Portugal and China.

== Notable artisans ==
- Soteno family of Metepec (pottery)
- Adrián Luis González
- Apolinar Hernández Balcazar
