= Pottery of Metepec =

Pottery of the city in Mexico

Coordinates: 19°15′N 99°36′W

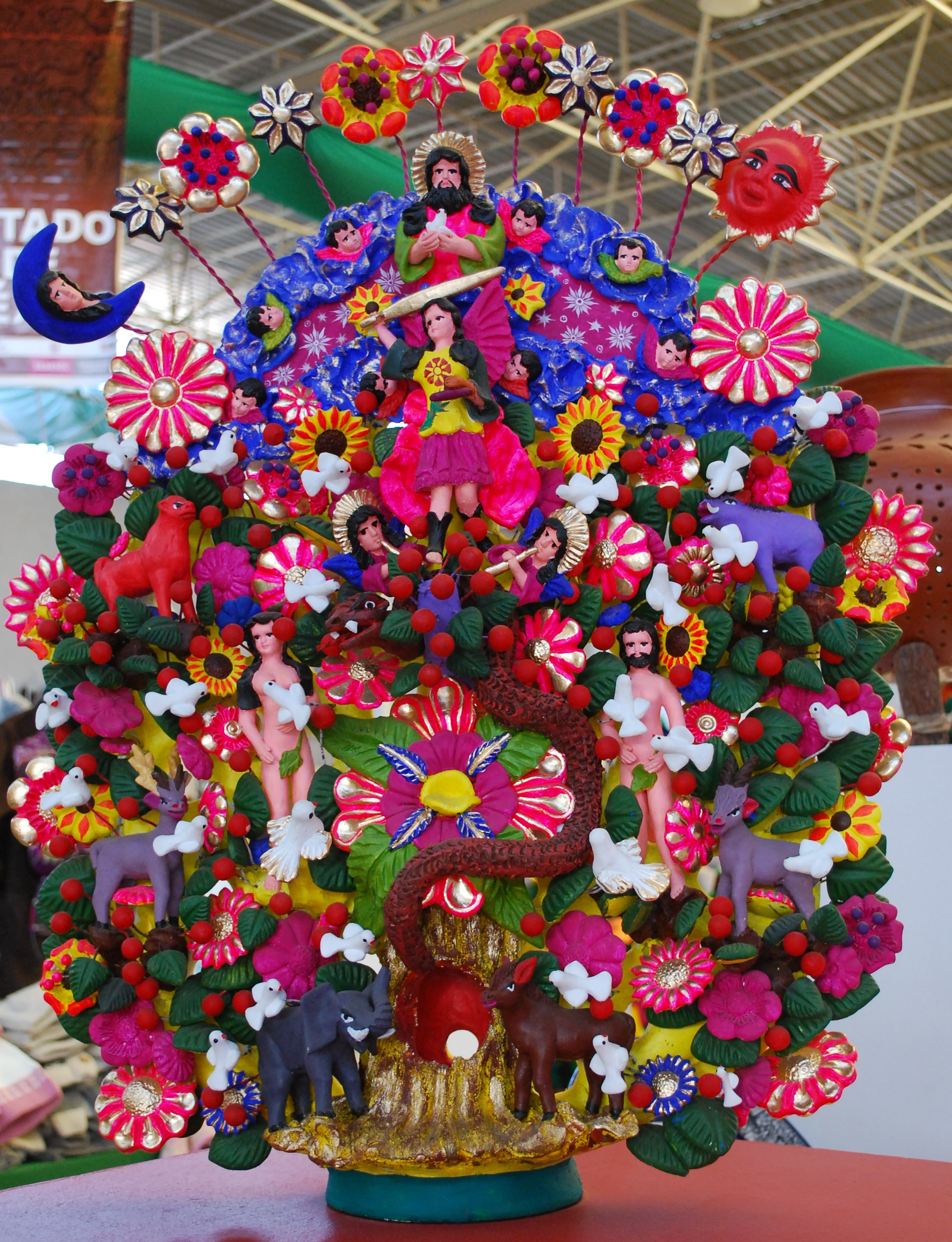
Traditional Tree of Life sculpture

The pottery of Metepec is that of a municipality in central Mexico, located near Mexico City. It is noted for durable utilitarian items but more noted for its decorative and ritual items, especially sculptures called “trees of life,” decorative plaques in sun and moon shapes and mermaid like figures called Tlanchanas. Metepec potters such as the Soteno family have won national and international recognition for their work and the town hosts the annual Concurso Nacional de Alfarería y Cerámica.

== Production ==
Metepec is one of a number of ceramic centers in Mexico, along with Oaxaca, Puebla, various parts of Michoacán and the Guadalajara area although it produces a significantly smaller quantity. While other handcrafts are made in the municipality, pottery is the most important. The creation of pottery in Metepec is traditional, family-oriented and of a distinctive local design and manufacture. It maintains many of its traditional techniques from the colonial period, passed down in pottery making families usually done by men but women are also involved. In many areas such as the neighborhood of Cuaxustenco, family homes double as workshops able to handle all phases of creation including firing. The pottery can be distinguished by both the clays it uses as well as its shapes and decorative styles, which unique to the area although not absolutely purist. The clay used in Metepec pottery is extracted from neighboring areas such as Octotitlán, San Felipe Tlamimilolpan and Tlacotepec. This originally was down with cart and donkey but today is done with motorized vehicles. There are three main clays, red, a sandy yellow and black. The most traditional shaping method is coiling over a tortilla-like base.

== Products ==
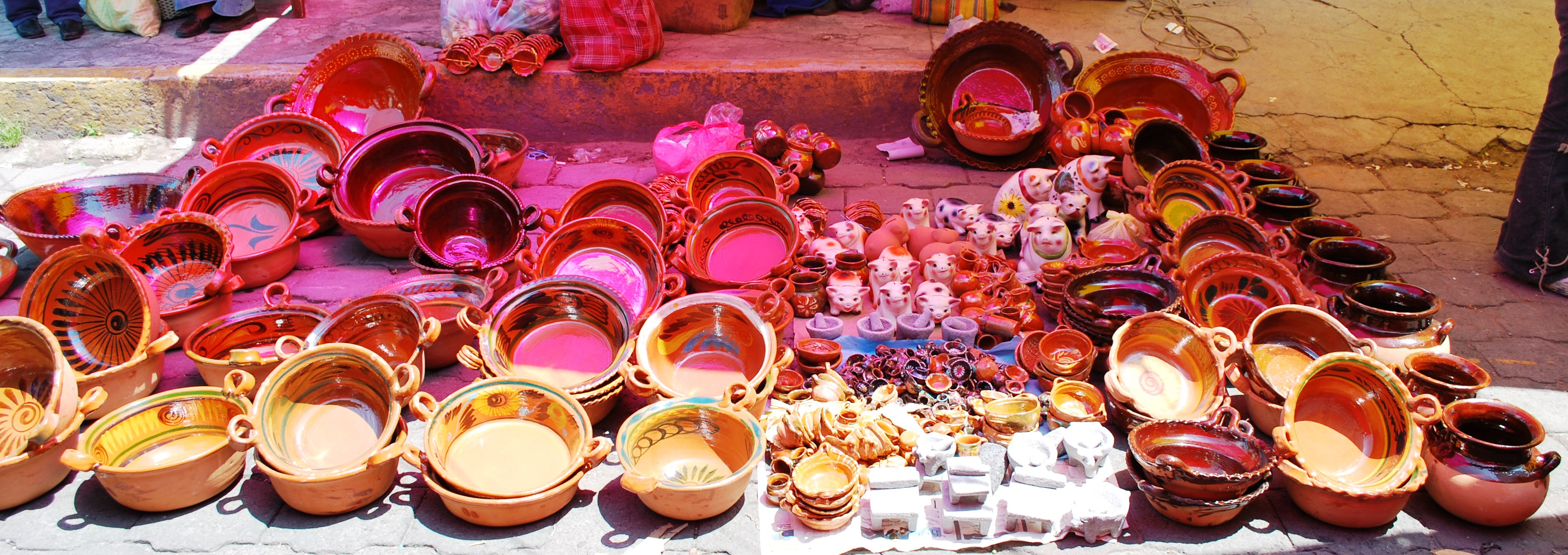
Pots and other utensils at a market in Metepec

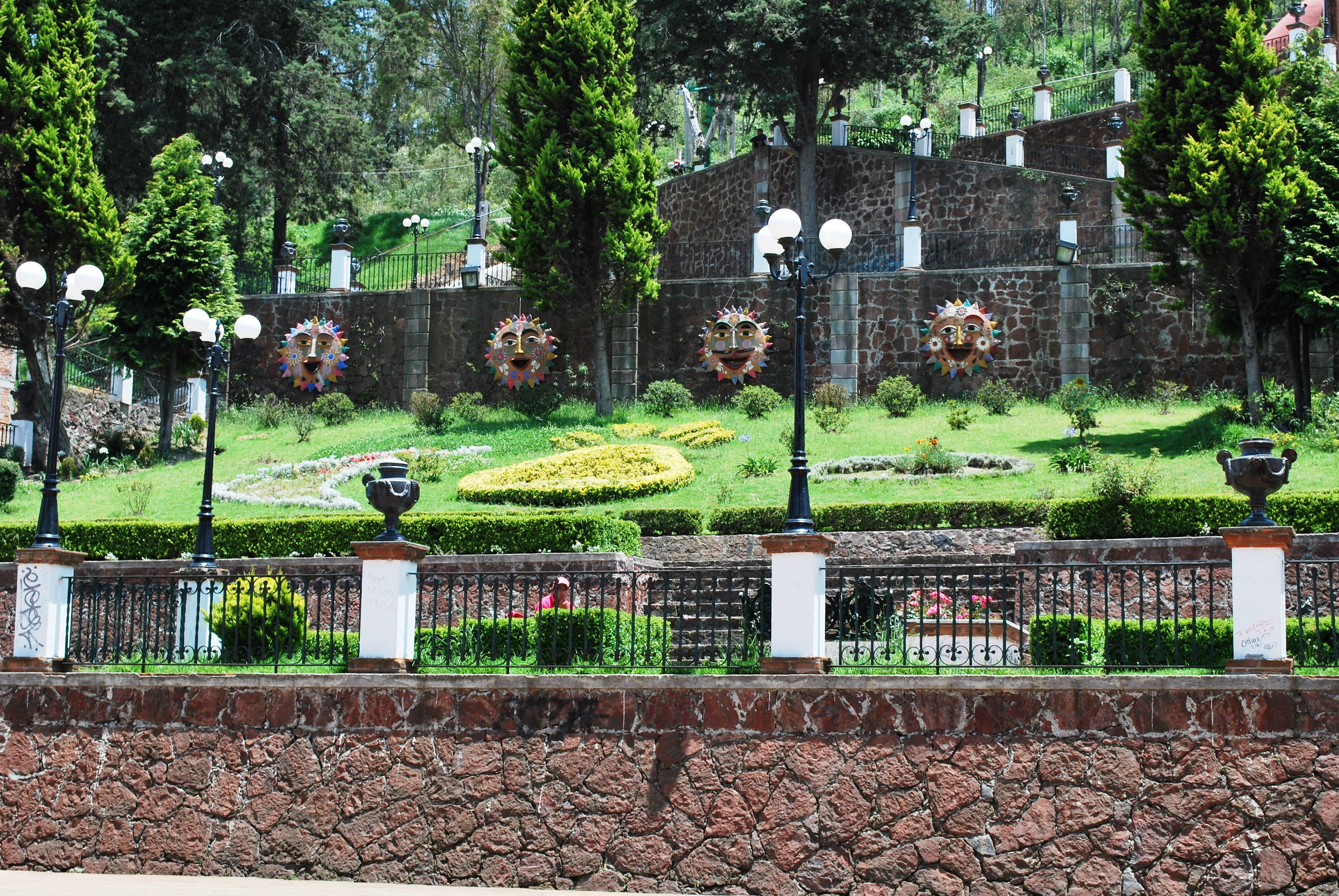
Sun shaped plaques on the wall of the main church in Metepec

Utilitarian pieces such as cookware and dishes made in the area are called “loza” traditionally colored with clear, yellow, black and green glazes. These are generally made by potters who specialize in this kind of ware and are produced in a commercial manner. These are what are most commonly available in street markets. However, some of the artisans produce highly decorated items such as pulque jugs with animal heads for spouts. Metepec’s cookware, especially the very large double handed pots used to cook large quantities of traditional dishes like moles are considered to be heavy duty and resistant to breakage. The most popular of this type has a black glaze.

However, Metepec is better known for its more decorative and artistic items. The most important of these are the “tree of life” sculptures which have both religious and decorative functions. Originally these were pieces depicting the Garden of Eden story (often depicted with Mexican flora and fauna) but since has developed with various motifs and themes as well as sizes from miniature to monumental. Classic trees of life are three levels, with God depicted in the highest level. The middle level depicts the paradise of Eden and the lower level the fleeing of Adam and Eve from the Garden after their expulsion. The trees are filled in Baroque fashion with a plethora of flowers, birds, animals and more. Depictions of God vary and are sometimes accompanied by angels and other heavenly figures. However, trees have been made with other motifs including secular and historical ones. A Tree of Life with a Virgin of Guadalupe motif is in the Vatican.

Another distinctive item made in Metepec are sun and moon plaques in bright colors and with faces, meant to be hung on interior and exterior walls. The suns generally have smiling faces and painted in bright colors. The moon appears in all phases generally with a coquettish expression and with red lips and flowers.

Even more distinctive is a mermaid like figure called a Tlanchana. These figures are based on a fantastical creature of pre Hispanic origin whose name means “lady of the sweet waters.” According to indigenous lore, a Tlanchana lives in fresh water areas and attracts men with her beauty then taking them down into the depths of the water. This idea comes from a time when the Metepec area was filled with shallow lakes and marshes. In the main plaza of Metepec, there is a large Tlanchana fountain, created from local clay.

The municipality makes many other decorative items. One important lines are those created to celebrate Day of the Dead such as skulls, candles holders, La Calavera Catrina and more, as well as numerous flowerpots and fountains, some monumental, to be used in gardens. Other decorative items include crucifixes, angels, images of the Virgin Mary and saint, animal figures and fantasy creatures.

== Sales ==
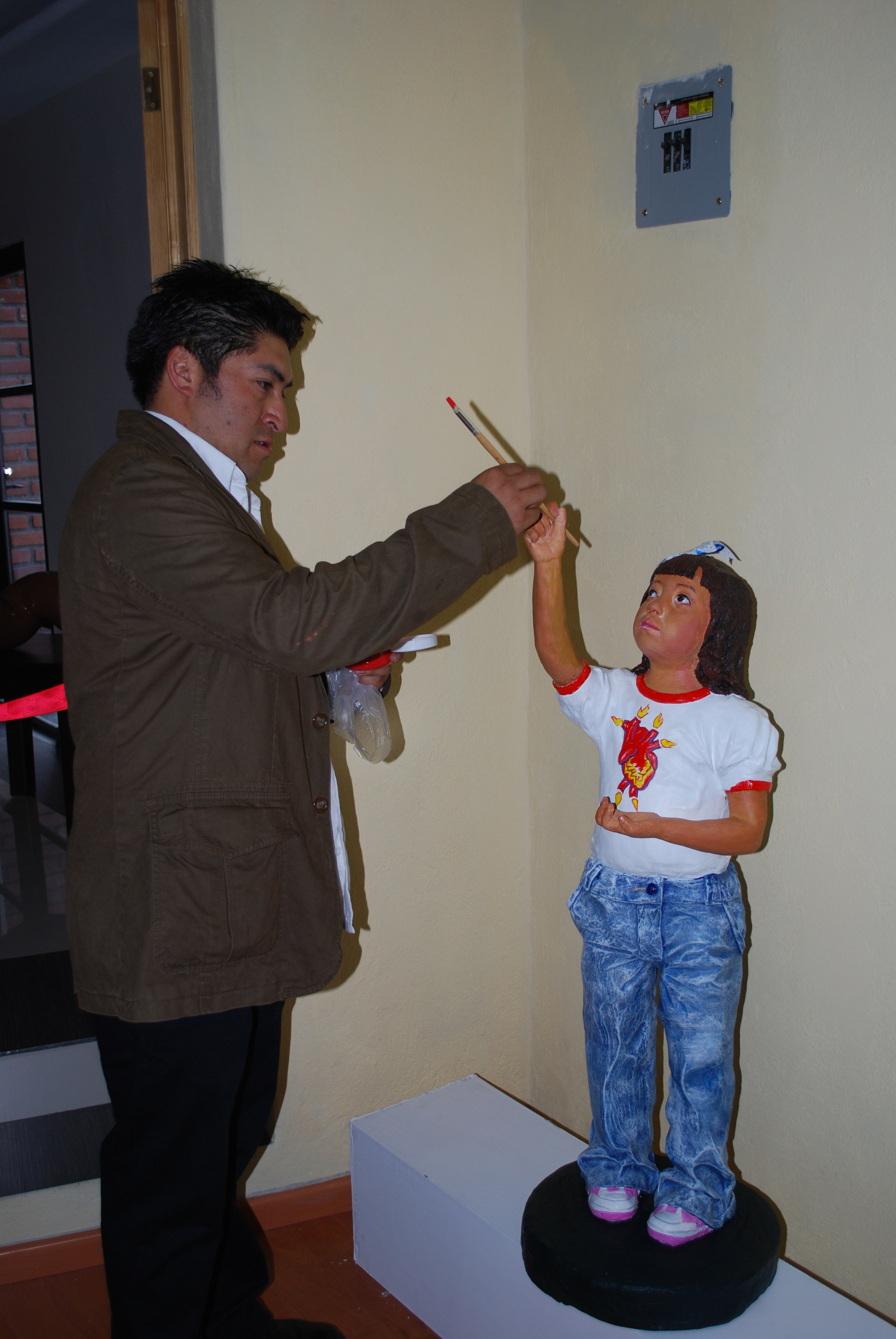
Israel Soteno putting finishing touch on clay sculpture at an opening in the Cafe La Vid in Metepec

Metepec is a municipality located in the State of Mexico, a suburb of the state capital of Toluca and just west of the Federal District of Mexico City. The most traditional way of selling the area’s pottery is by the family artisans themselves with relatively little sold by third parties. The streets of the old town are filled with visitors on weekends from Mexico City and Toluca, many of which come to buy pottery and other handcrafts. Because of this and the traditional colonial architecture of the historic center, the town has been named a Pueblo con Encanto by the State of Mexico and a Pueblo Mágico by the federal government, even though these are surrounded by large housing divisions and modern commercial centers. Most places selling pottery and other crafts from Metepec are in the historic center of the town. The main pottery neighborhoods are Santiaguito, Santa Cruz, San Miguel, San Mateo and Espíritu Santo. One important outlet is the government run is the Casa del Artesano, which also holds workshops and gives explanations about the history and making of pottery in the municipality. It also exhibits pieces which have won national and international awards.

== The artisans ==
Potters in Metepec tend to specialize in either utilitarian items or in decorative items. About 275 families are involved in the making of pottery, which is the main employment for the municipality. About 200 of these have open workshops where visitors can enter and buy. A number of families are particularly known for their tradition works such as trees of life, including the Soteno family which has received recognition for their work both in Mexico and abroad. In 2012 ceramicist Alfonso Soteno received recognition for his work from the government of Cuba at the Casa de las Americas. In addition to classic pieces, there are also clay sculptors experimenting with new designs as well. One of these is Manuel León Montes de Oca known for reproductions of pre Hispanic pottery. Another is Raul Leon Ortega who has been making contemporary clay sculptures, based on the tradition of Ocumicho, Michoacán.

== National pottery contest ==
Each year the town hosts the Concurso Nacional de Alfarería y Cerámica (National Pottery and Ceramic Contest) open it any artisan in Mexico. It is sponsored by the State of Mexico, the Fondo Nacional para el Fomento de las Artesanía, the Instituto de Investigación y Fomento Artesanal of the State of Mexico, the Secretariat of Tourism and the municipality of Metepec. Categories include traditional glazing, lead-free glazing, miniatures, best female potter, children’s categories and high fire ceramics. This event is held each May as part of the municipality’s celebration of its patron saint Isidore the Laborer.

In 2012 the Concurso Nacional had eighty five participants from the area and other states such as Jalisco, Oaxaca, Morelos, Veracruz and Guerrero registering 196 pieces with a total purse of 450,000 pesos. Winning pieces become part of the collection of the Museo del Barro opened in 2012 to exhibit pieces from all over Mexico.

== History ==
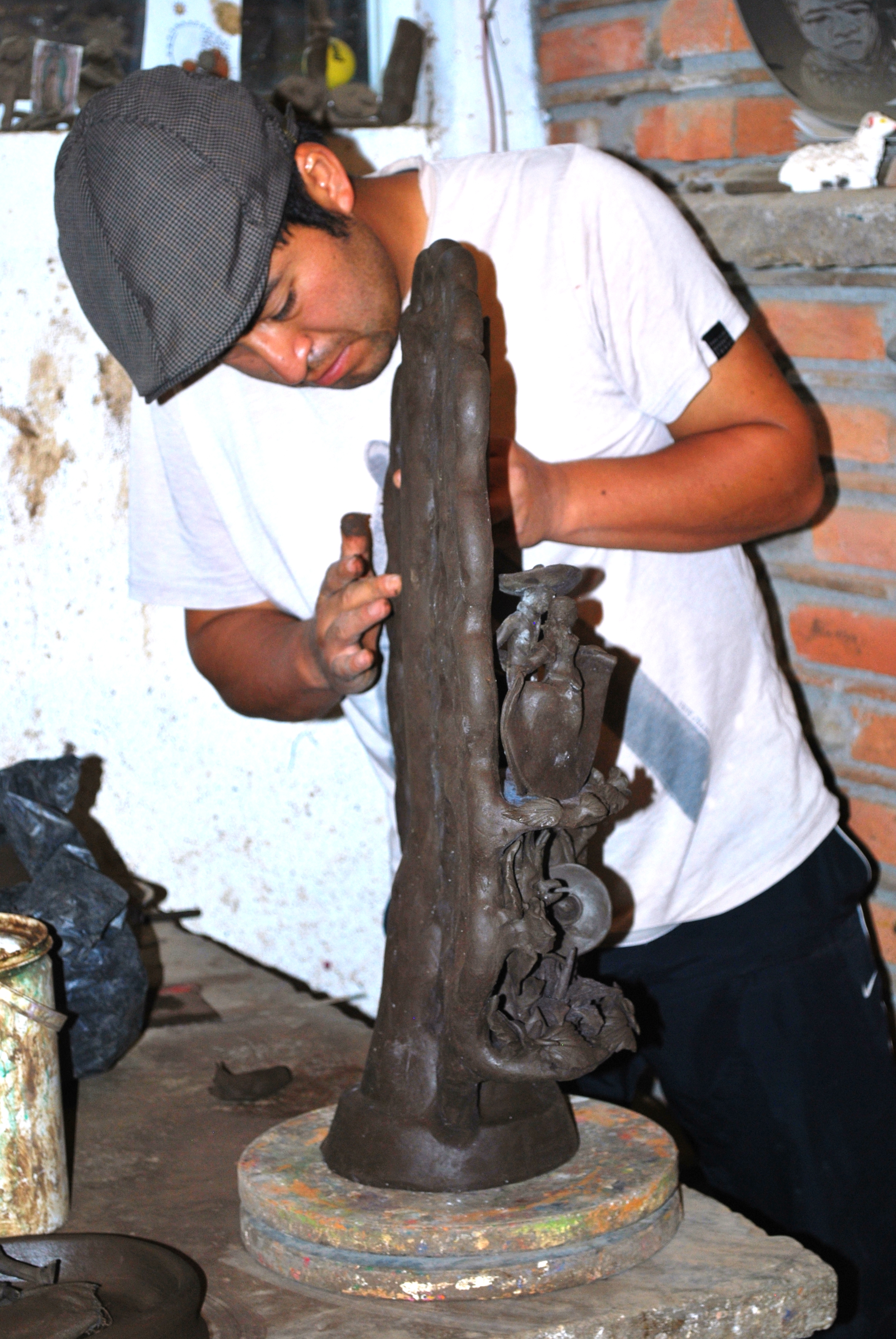
Israel Soteno working on a piece in the family workshop

Pottery in Metepec and the rest of the Toluca Valley began in the pre Hispanic period during which both utilitarian and decorative/ritual items were made. Pottery in the Valley of Toluca shows strong Nahua influence, especially Aztec. This is especially true for urns, braziers, cups and plates. Another important influence was from the Cholula area of Puebla in the use of polychrome decoration. Decorative techniques included stamping, painting, incising, scraping and raised relief.

After the Conquest, Spanish techniques and designs were introduced. The two main techniques were the introduction of the potter’s wheel and glazing, both integrated into Mexican pottery to varying extents during the colonial period. In addition to pottery techniques, the Spanish introduced European designs from the Renaissance as well as some Chinese ones. However, a number of native motifs survived, principally depictions of native flora and fauna.

While ceramics have been produced in all of the Toluca Valley, those of Metepec have had a particularly good reputation for both quality and creativity. Metepec ceramics mostly focused on utilitarian items from the colonial period to the mid 20th century. Sometime in the 1950s, more decorative items began to be made. From the colonial period into the 20th century, demand for Metepec pottery grew, even spawning a number middlemen business for distribution; however, this method of doing business is considered less traditional, with a preference artisan families selling their own wares. Starting the 20th century, Metepec pottery has won awards such as the Galardón Presidencial.

Metepec is the most important tourist destination in the Valley of Toluca because of its handcrafts, even having eight five-star hotels. Eighty percent of the municipality’s economy is based on pottery, commerce and real estate. However, making a living through pottery has become difficult especially for those who create utilitarian items and for those whose work is not famous. Sales and tourism have decreased with some artisans seeing a drop of as much as eighty percent, forcing them into other occupations and making it difficult to maintain the tradition in families. One problem with sales is the existence of copycat projects, including trees of life made in China and elsewhere. Another is vendors in Metepec who sell wares from other states without marking them as such. One of Metepec’s ceramics families is the Ortegas, which has worked in clay for five generations and whose current patriarch, Odilón, is considered a master potter in Metepec. Despite this, the family workshop makes only about thirty percent of what it used to.

To combat the decline of its pottery making traditions, municipal and state authorities have implemented a number of measures. Metepec has acknowledged the importance of its pottery tradition by erection monumental clay sculptures such as trees of life, fountains and more on various plazas and streets. The municipal government created a handcraft market in the town in 1998 to bring together families that make baskets, leather goods, glass and more as well as pottery. One effort by the State of Mexico to promote the craft has been to install monumental Trees of Life in each of Mexico’s embassies worldwide. The Metepec government works to promote the municipality’s pottery and to ensure buyers obtain authentic pieces. This is especially true for Trees of Life. Tree of life sculptures of Metepec now have a collective registered trademark, one of only four in Mexico. This means that artisans of Metepec may now add special hologram decals and registration numbers to their work to prove authenticity.

== Bibliography ==
- Metepec y su arte en barro [Metepec and its art in clay] (in Spanish and English). Vol. 30. Mexico City: Artes de México. 2001. ISBN 968-6533-99-0.
- Huitron, Antonio (1999). Metepec: Miseria y Grandeza del Barro [Metepec: Misery and Greatness in Clay] (in Spanish). Toluca: Universidad Autónoma del Estado de Mexico. ISBN 968-835-386-8.
