= Soteno family =

Mexican ceramic artisan family

Coordinates: 19°15′13.04″N 99°36′16.03″W

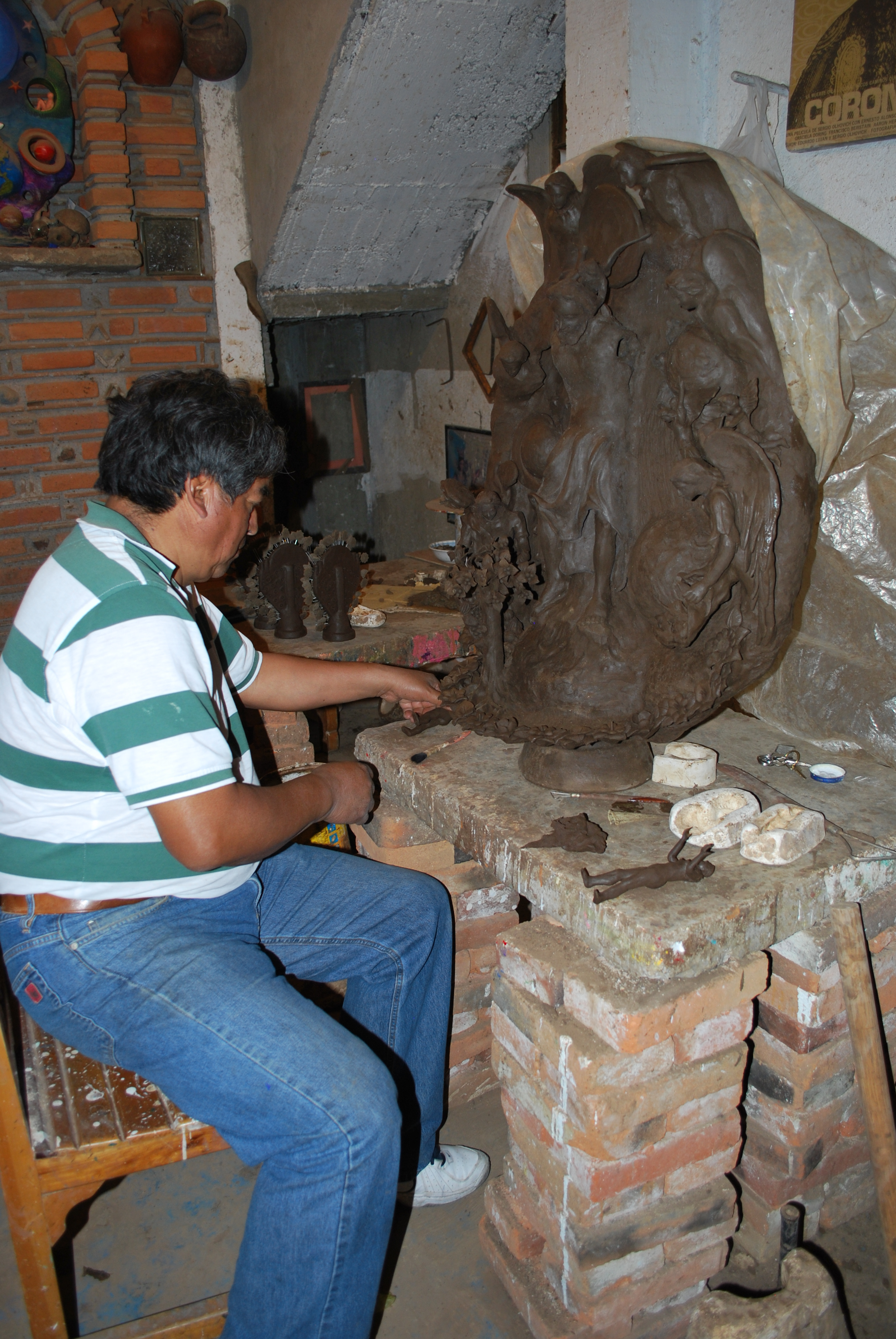
Tiburcio Soteno working on a sculpture in his workshop

The Soteno family of Metepec is one of the main families of ceramic artisans specializing in sculptures called Trees of Life which have made the town found in the State of Mexico one of Mexico’s main ceramic centers. The Tree of Life is a complicated colorful sculpture which was developed from the creation of candlesticks. The family’s prominence began with Modesta Fernández Mata, the mother, grandmother and great-grandmother of the Soteno potters today, who began experimenting making more decorative items along with utilitarian ones. The generations after her have learned the craft and improved on it starting as children working with parents and grandparents. The two most notable members of the family are Tiburcio and Oscar, second and third generation respectively, who have won various awards and have their works in collections worldwide.

== History ==
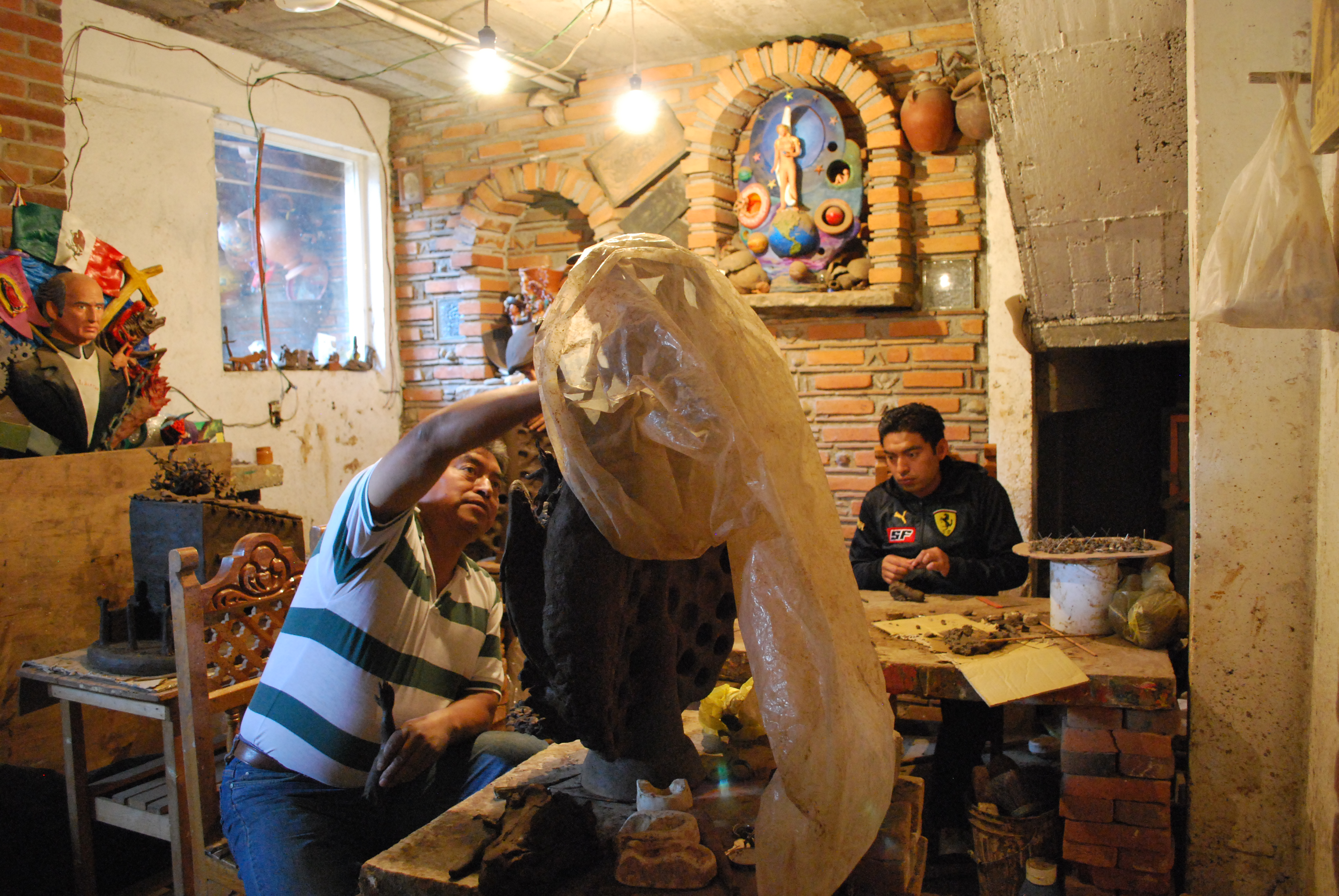
View of the Tiburcio Soteno workshop in Metepec

The Sotenos are one of the families of ceramic artisans that have made Metepec an important production center in Mexico. Metepec is known for sun decorations for walls, guitar-strumming mermaids, skeletal figures, animals of Noah's Ark along with other items, which attract buyers from Mexico City and Toluca. The municipality is a suburb of industrial Toluca but the historic center still maintains its rural feel with tile roofs and stone paved streets. The making of pottery in the Valley of Toluca goes back at least 1000 years due to rich clay deposits. In the colonial period, Metepec become a ceramics center, blending European and indigenous traditions, mostly specializing in black and green tableware, toys, religious figure and candlestick holders. Diego Rivera is credited with introducing new color schemes to a pottery making family in the 1940s with other workshops following suit. Around the same time, Metepec potters became to transform candleholders into tree sculptures which have become the town’s best known exports. The original trees were relatively plain with limited motifs, mostly the Garden of Eden. Over time, they became more elaborate, more colorful and larger.

The Soteno pottery family descends from Darío Soteno León and Modesta Fernández Mata. Both were potters making utilitarian items, but in the 1930s Modesta began to experiment with more decorative items, starting with whistles in animal shapes as one of Metepec’s pioneer potters. She has a prestigious contest named after her called the Modesta Fernandez National Pottery and Ceramic Competition, which attracts artisan from all over Mexico. The couple produced ten children Mónico, Carmen, Estela, Alfonso, Víctor, Tiburcio, Pedro, Teresa, Manuel and Agustina, all of which have worked in pottery. Like many other workshops in the town, the Sotenos work in multigenerational enterprises with four generations in the vocation.

Each artisan in the family has its own style and preferences in shaping items and the paints used. The Soteno artists have garnered acclaim both at home and abroad, as their sculptures are part of museum collections in Mexico, the United States, Canada, Europe and South Africa . Their works can be found in private collections, museums, galleries and other institutions in the U.S., France, Sweden, Japan, Switzerland, Germany, England, China and Brazil. The family hopes that the tradition with continue with the succeeding generations.

== Tree of Life sculptures ==
There are several Soteno workshops which are intergenerational. These workshops produce a number of products including figures for Nativity scenes and other Christmas items, especially the workshop of Juan Manuel Soteno, with pieces for the sets can range from fifty to seven thousand pesos with pieces up to 1.2 meters tall. Another product are skeletons and skulls associated with Day of the Dead .

However, the Sotenos are best known for Tree of Life sculptures. The time it takes to complete a Tree depends on size and complexity, anywhere from a day to two months of 15-hour workdays. Sizes can range from twenty centimeters to over a meter in height. The sculptures are made from the reddish and yellow clays found in a nearby community called Ocotitlán. The mined clay is left out to dry and the clumps broken up, sometimes but putting them out into the street for cars to roll over. As needed, the powdered clay is mixed with water and a flower called “tule” to soften and whiten the clay. The small details may be made with molds, but a number of artisans in the family, including Oscar, prefer to do it all by hand. Details and branches may be attached or reinforced by wire, but both Oscar and Tiburcio avoid the use of wire as it can break over time. The piece is carefully dried and fired. The largest trees may be fired in separate parts and in stages. Then they painted with anilines, natural pigments, acrylics and sometimes enamel.

== Tiburcio Soteno ==
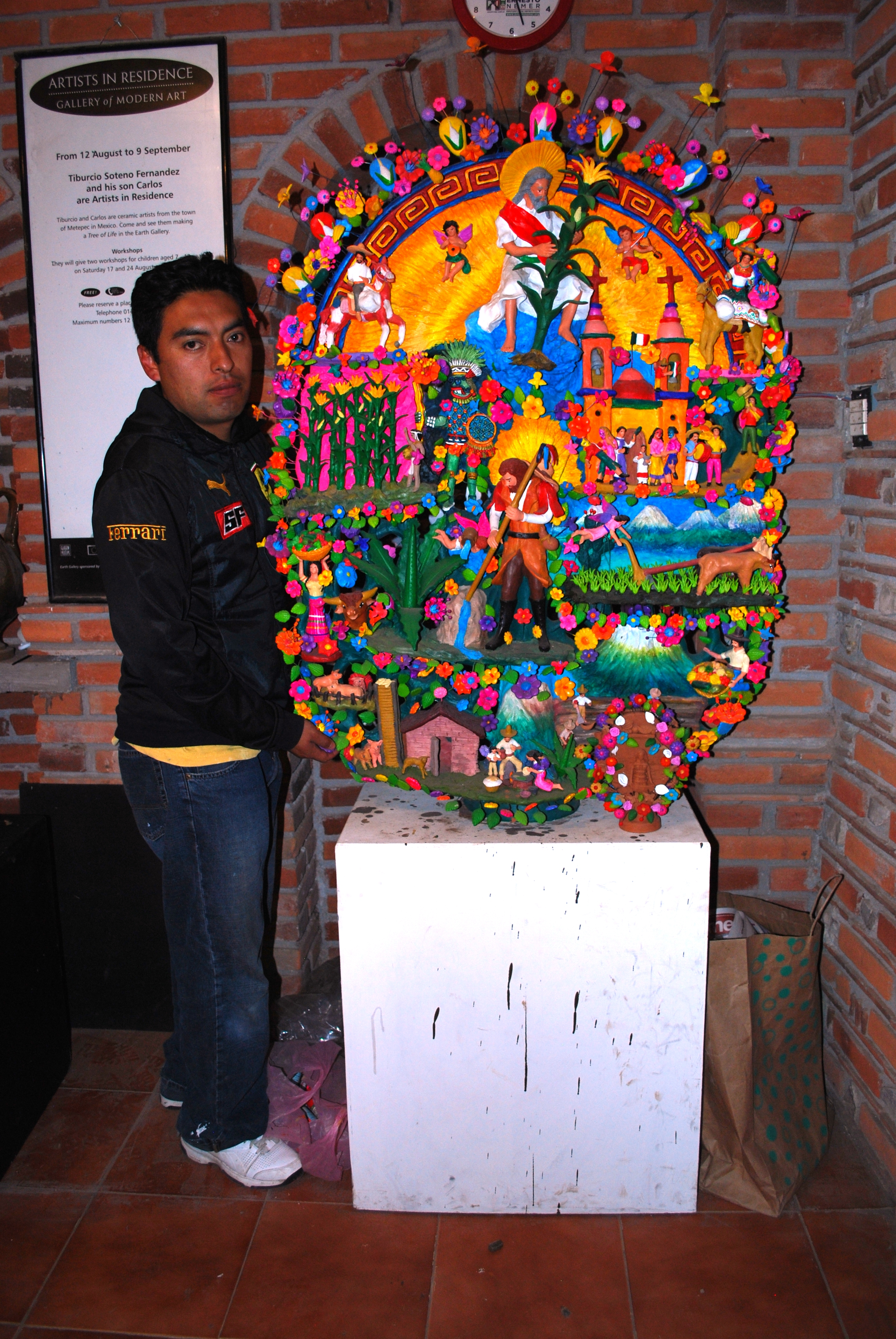
Carlos Soteno with one of his creations at the family workshop

Today, the patriarch of the Soteno family is Tiburcio Soteno Fernández. He was taught to work clay by his parents eventually coming to specialize in Trees of Life. As an adult with his own workshop, his wife Amelia helped when his own children, Saul, Carlos and Israel were young. Now they all work with their father at the workshop on Calle Ezequiel Capistran, along with their wives and Tiburcio’s grandchildren. This workshop does not have a gallery but instead works by special order.

Tibercio earns on average only 2,000 pesos a week making pieces that can value at over 8,000. He has sold pieces for as high as $5,000 USD. Pieces from his workshop rated from seven cm to over five meters in height. Today Tiburcio tries to fill in as many empty spaces as possible to avoid the use of wire, which he says rusts over time, making the piece fall apart. Tiburcio calls his work “arbóles retablo” or altarpiece trees. Tiburcio models most of the pieces by hand, only occasionally using molds. He uses aniline dyes for color.

Tiburcio says that he tries to create stories with his trees. Themes of these trees have ranged from the religious to the erotic, with famous characters such as the Virgin of Guadalupe and Frida Kahlo as well as stories of everyday people who placed special orders. When he receives a special order, he researches the topic before beginning to sculpt. One such order was based on Laura Esquivel’s novel Like Water for Chocolate . Other themes have included Dante's Inferno, the discovery of the Americas, the life of poet Sor Juana, the Mexican War of Independence and an epic tree with the title of “The Conquest of Mexico.”

He has pieces in the permanent collections of the British Museum, the Museum of Modern Art in Scotland, the Lancaster City Museum and in various museums in France. One particular permanent exhibition of his work is at the Museum of Mankind in London which relates to Day of the Dead as well as a piece dedicated to the 500th anniversary of Columbus’s discovery of America. His works are in many private collections including those of French cinematographer François Reichenbach. He has exhibited at the San Ildefonso College in Mexico City. Other works can be found in Canada, Italy and Germany. For 2010, the family made a number of pieces related to the Bicentennial of Mexico’s Independence features figures such as Miguel Hidalgo y Costilla, José María Morelos y Pavón, Emiliano Zapata and Pancho Villa . He created the Tree of Life that appears in the church of San Francisco in Ecuador, whose story extends from the origin of sin in the Garden of Eden to the 21st century. Tiburcio also created the three meter tall double sided Tree sculpture that is on the place next to the 16th century Franciscan monastery in his hometown of Metepec.

Tiburcio, along with Carlos Soteno, has traveled abroad for exhibitions and lectures, including those at the Museum of Man and the ethnography department of the Museum of London . He has won a number of awards and recognitions including the La Rosa de Oro, the Maestro de Maestros (1995), Concurso Nacional de Artesanías in Metepec, Premio Fomento Cultural Banamex (1996) and the Presea Estado de México (2000) .

== Oscar Soteno ==
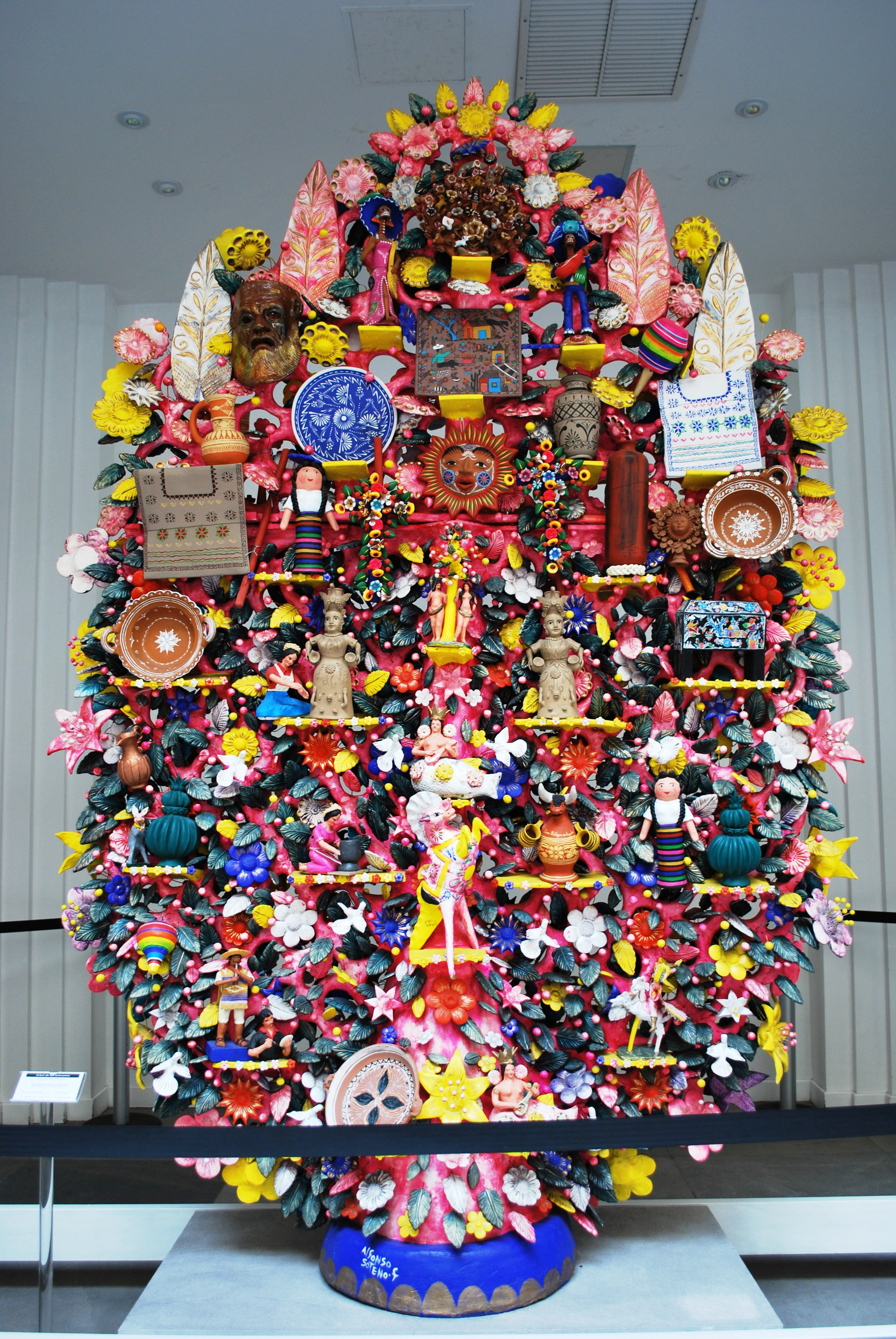
Tree of Life sculpture by Oscar Soteno at the Museo de Arte Popular in Mexico City

Oscar Soteno is Tiburcio’s nephew, the son of Alfonso Soteno. Like the generation before him, he learned to work clay as a child, specializing in Trees of Life as an adult in 1988. Today he runs his own shop with his wife Maria and three other family members. Most of the works from this shop measure one meter high by 85 cm wide although much larger and smaller ones are also produced. Oscar Soteno Elías family workshop is just outside Metepec on the highway that leads to Ixtapan de la Sal. The workshop is dominated by a large courtyard which is in turn dominated by two large brick and adobe kilns where the pieces are fired. Just off the courtyard is the small gallery where pieces are exhibited and sold. Oscar Soteno has also been experimenting with selling his pieces online, especially Day of the Dead themed work for Halloween in the United States, with sales rising.

Oscar has his own niche. He makes the traditional Trees of Life with the traditional theme of Adam and Eve and the Garden of Eden, but he also makes trees with other themes such as the life of Christ, the love story of a couple, and trees covered with monarch butterflies. Occasionally he creates trees with multiple faces, usually three, which cover diverse themes. For example, a tree can have a scene depicting the birth of Christ, the Last Supper and the Crucifixion. Another example is the courtship, marriage and death of a couple. To decorate the trees, fine brushes and paints made himself from natural pigments are generally used. The final piece receives a coat of glue-based varnish. Attention is paid to the details.

Oscar created a tree to honor his grandmother, Modesta, who died in 1987. This prizewinning sculpture features a figure of Modesta, sitting in a chair painting a tiny mermaid figure. The rest of the tree has small scale representations of typical Mexican handcrafts including a miniature Tree of Life. It is to represent what she began making, which at first were whistles and piggy banks. He was also commissioned for sculptures by John Paul II .

Oscar has exhibited extensively in national and international museums. His pieces stand out for the quality of the finish and their variety of rich colors. He has won a number of acknowledgements and awards at exhibitions, competitions and art fairs, including the Galardón Nacional in Jalisco in 1995 and the Premio Fomento Cultural Banamex in 1996. He was selected by the Fomento Cultural Banamex to participate in the organization’s program to promote Mexican handcrafts and folk art as one of Mexico’s 150 Great Masters of Mexican Folk Art.

== Other members of the family ==
Mónico Soteno Fernández is the oldest brother of the family. He learned pottery from his maternal grandparents as well as his mother, starting at age seven. He is considered to be one of the founders of Metepec’s Tree of Life tradition. He has won various awards including the Premio Pantaleón Panduro from the state of Jalisco the XV Premio Nacional de Cerámica and first and second place in the Segundo Concurso Nacional de Objetos Navideños Tradicionales. He has exhibited his work in The Founder’s Gallery at the University of California, San Diego, the Conjunto Ollin Yoliztli, Galería Toltecayotl, " and at the Galería Flora in Torreón, Coahuila.

Carlos Moisés Soteno is the son of Tiburcio and has traveled with his father for exhibitions and lectures. His works are part of the collections of museums in Europe and Canada.

The Cuban government honored José Alfonso Soteno Fernández granting the Haydee Santamaría medal. It was awarded for a Tree of Life sculpture donated to Cuba in 1975 by then Mexican president Luis Echeverría Álvarez. This sculpture is seven meters tall and contains 663 figures including mermaids, suns and moons which has become one of the symbols of the Casa de las Américas in Havana.

== Museum Collections ==
- Art Museum of Southeast Texas, Beaumont, Texas

== See also ==
List of Mexican artisans
