= Adrián Luis González =

Adrián Luis González (born May 5, 1939) is a Mexican potter specializes in Trees of Life and other decorative pieces.

González lives and works in Metepec, State of Mexico, a town noted for its decorative pottery, especially Trees of Life and suns with faces as wall decorations. He learned the craft from another noted potter of the town, Timoteo Sanchez. Today González has his own workshop in which he works with his three sons, working in yellow red clays mined from the nearby town of Ocotitlán.

González is best known for his Trees of Life, with one of his pieces winning the Galardon Nacional in 1985, the highest award of the National Ceramics Competition in Tlaquepaque. (grandes) These decorative sculptures are made with various themes such as spring, the birth of Jesus, life and death and sometimes even entire genealogies, both painted and left in the natural clay color. He also makes miniatures, such as Noah's Ark sets, sun images, religious medallions, angels, musicians, Catrina figures and decorative dishes. His works are noted for the use of earth tones in the paints, being one of the first in Metepec to use these more subtle colors. González's dedication to pottery extends to his home décor, which is filled with pieces that he made himself.

In 2001, the Fomento Cultural Bancomer called him “one of the best creator of Trees of Life in (Mexico) in the book Grandes Maestros del Arte Popular.
