= Tree of Life (Mexican pottery) =

Type of craft

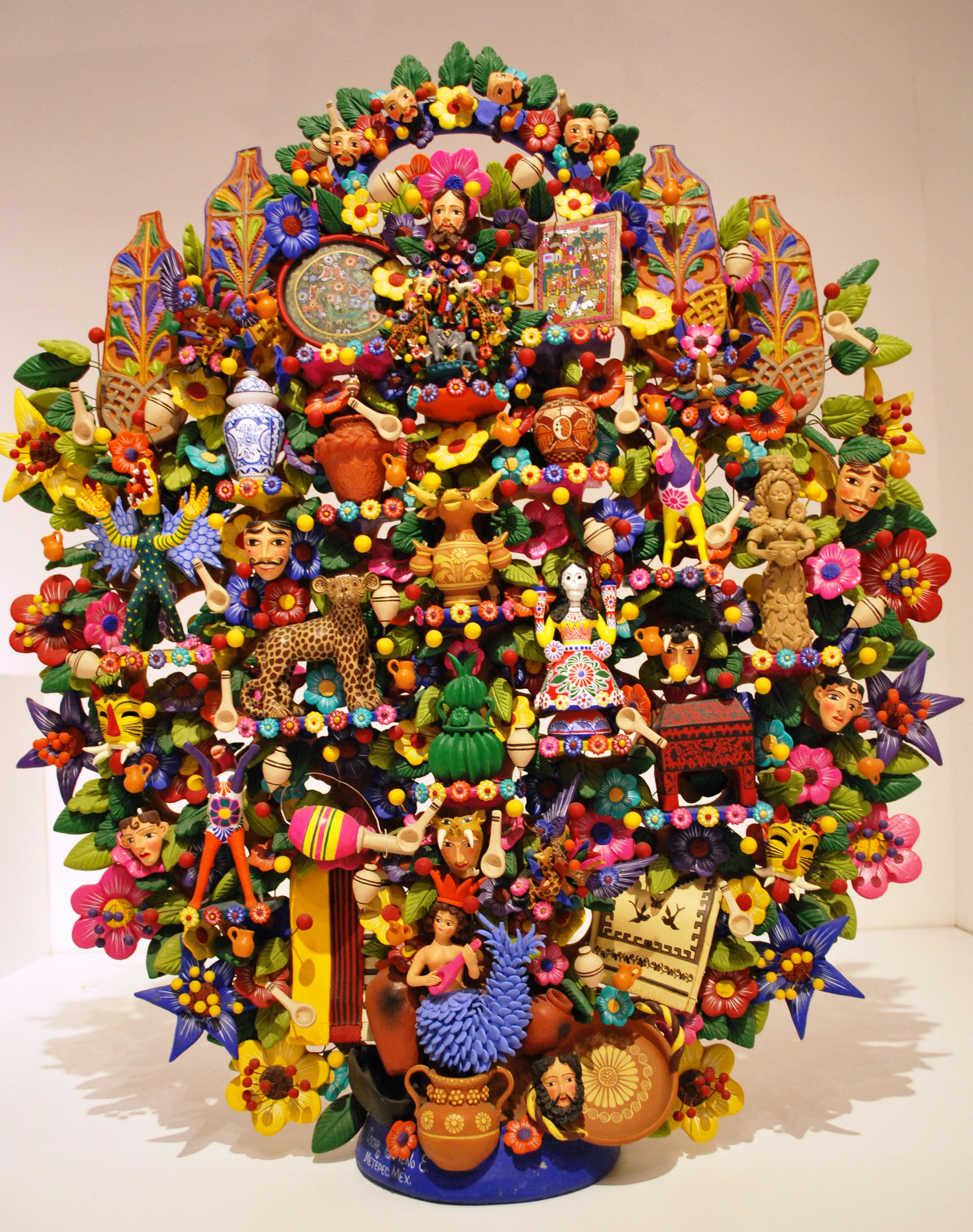
Tree of life at the Museo de Arte Popular in Mexico City, by Oscar Soteno

A Tree of Life (Spanish: Árbol de la vida) is a type of Mexican pottery sculpture traditional in central Mexico, especially in the municipality of State of Mexico. Originally the sculptures depicted the Biblical story of creation, as an aid for teaching it to natives in the early colonial period. The fashioning of the trees in a terracotta sculpture began in Izúcar de Matamoros, Puebla but today the craft is most closely identified with Metepec. Traditionally, these sculptures are supposed to consist of certain biblical images, such as Adam and Eve, but recently there have been trees created with themes completely unrelated to the Bible.

The tree is assembled while soft unfired clay from a large number of pieces formed separately.

== Origins of the craft ==
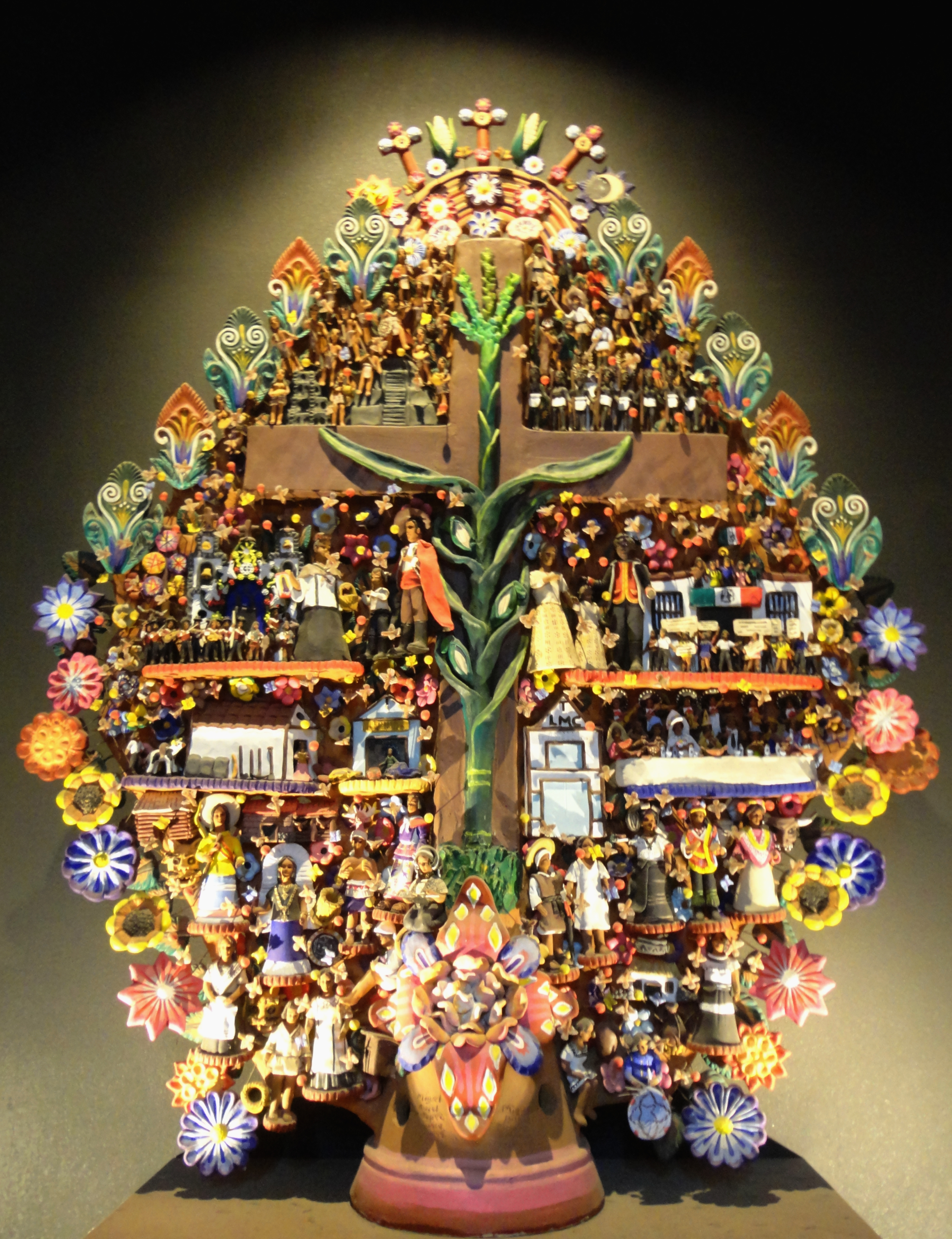
Traditional tree of life at National Museum of Anthropology, Mexico City.

The creation of Trees of Life is part of the pottery and ceramic traditions of central highlands of Mexico. Pottery in this area can be traced back to between 1800 and 1300 B.C. including clay figures. The painting of these figures begins later after Olmec influence arrived in the area. Around 800 A.D. Teotihuacan influence brought religious symbolism to many ceramic wares. From then on, Matlatzinca pottery in what is now Mexico State continued to develop with multiple influences since it was in a strategic position between the Valley of Mexico and what are now the states of Morelos and Guerrero.

After the Spanish conquest, friars destroyed articles, including ceramics, that depicted the old gods, and replaced them with images of saints and other Christian iconography. The depiction of a “tree of life” in paintings and other mediums was introduced as a way to evangelize Biblical stories to the native population.

During most of the colonial period, ceramics in Mexico State were mostly produced for self consumption. Ceramics became a fusion of Spanish and indigenous techniques and designs. It remained so until the first half of the 20th century, when decorative and even luxurious pieces began to be produced. This type of work is typified by the tree of life, especially those that are not religious in function. These non-religious trees have themes such as death or spring.

The construction of clay tree sculptures with the Biblical theme of the Garden of Eden began in Izucar de Matamoros in Puebla State and spread to other areas, particularly to Metepec, Mexico State, which distinguished their trees by painting them in bright colors. The tree sculptures have become emblematic of this municipality, and are part of a clay sculpture tradition found only here. Other common clay sculptures include mermaids (with a giant one in a section of town called Ciudad Tipica) as well as Pegasus, roosters, lions, flowers and more.

== Description ==
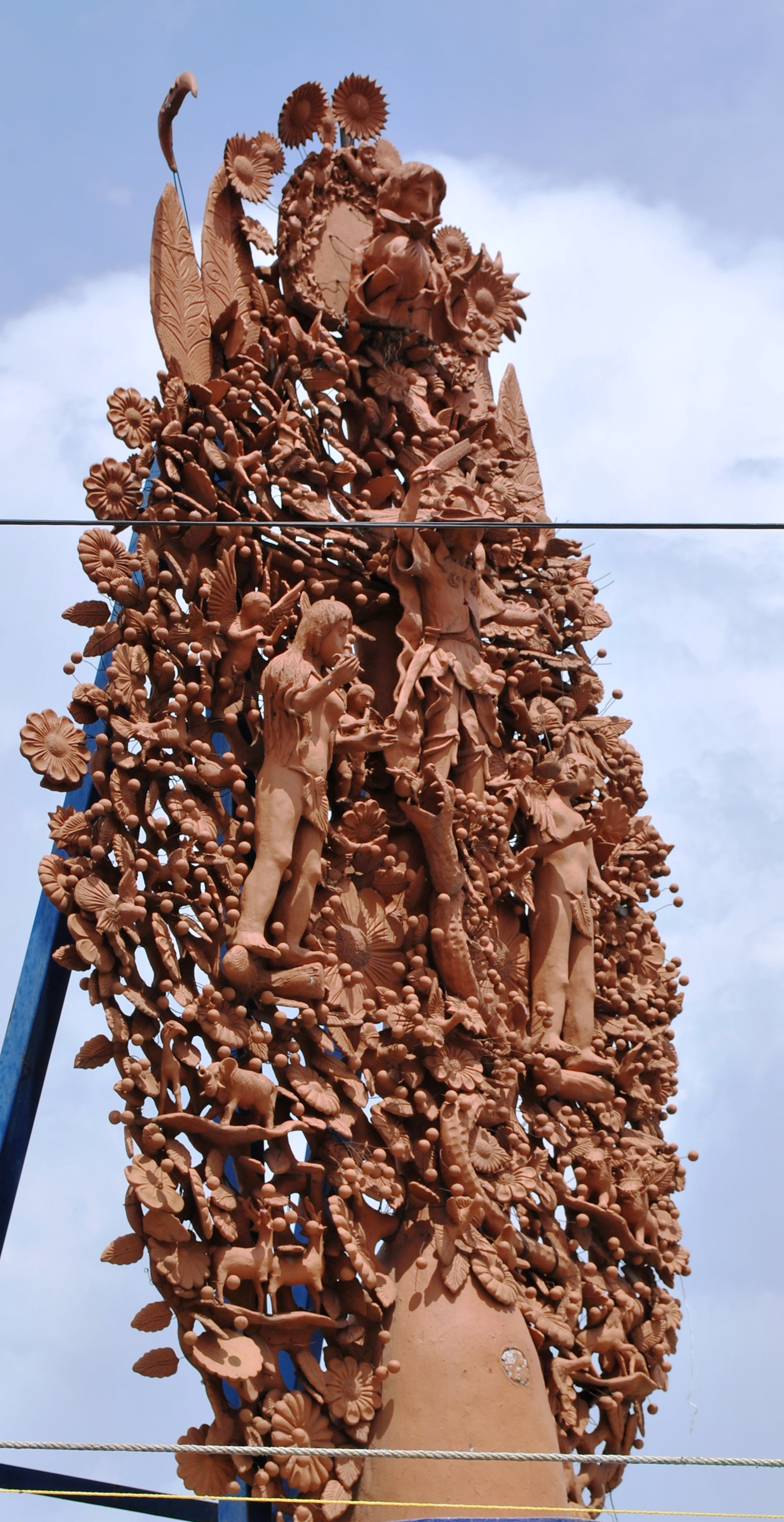
Large outdoor sculpture in Metepec with Adam and Eve

The most traditional of the trees of life contains a number of vital images. At the top of the sculpture, an image of God is placed. Underneath are images relation with the creation of the world in seven days, such as the sun and moon, the animals and Adam and Eve. The serpent from the Biblical story also appears, as does the Archangel Gabriel at the bottom, who casts out Adam and Eve from the Garden of Eden. Overall, the tree sculpture looks something like a candelabra. The trees are made primarily for religious and decorative use. Those that contain incense burners are more likely to be use religiously. In Izucar de Matamoros, these trees appear in processions such as those for Corpus Christi.

The trees are made from clay fired in gas ovens at a low temperature. Most trees are from between 26 and 60 cm in height and can take anywhere from two weeks to three months to create. Extremely large pieces can take up to three years. These trees vary in size from miniatures to gigantic public sculptures. Many trees have unique themes but the most common is the duality of life and death and the relationship of man with the natural world. Most trees are created and sold by artisans who have learned how to make them from their parents and grandparents.

Variations on the craft have appeared in recent decades. Many will have themes such as the duality of life and death, and the relationship of man with the natural world, but these often keep essential elements such as Adam and Eve. Tiburcio Soteno Fernandez is one of the few potters who will make arboles with themes completely unrelated to the Garden of Eden. Many of these represent the history of a famous person or place and are custom-ordered. His works have appeared in temporary and permanent collections in countries such as Scotland, the United States, Canada, Italy and France. However, purists insist that those that do not relate to the Garden of Eden are not true Trees of Life.

According to Juan José Rodríguez, the tree of life appears on the cover of the Sgt. Pepper's Lonely Hearts Club Band album by The Beatles.

== State of the craft ==
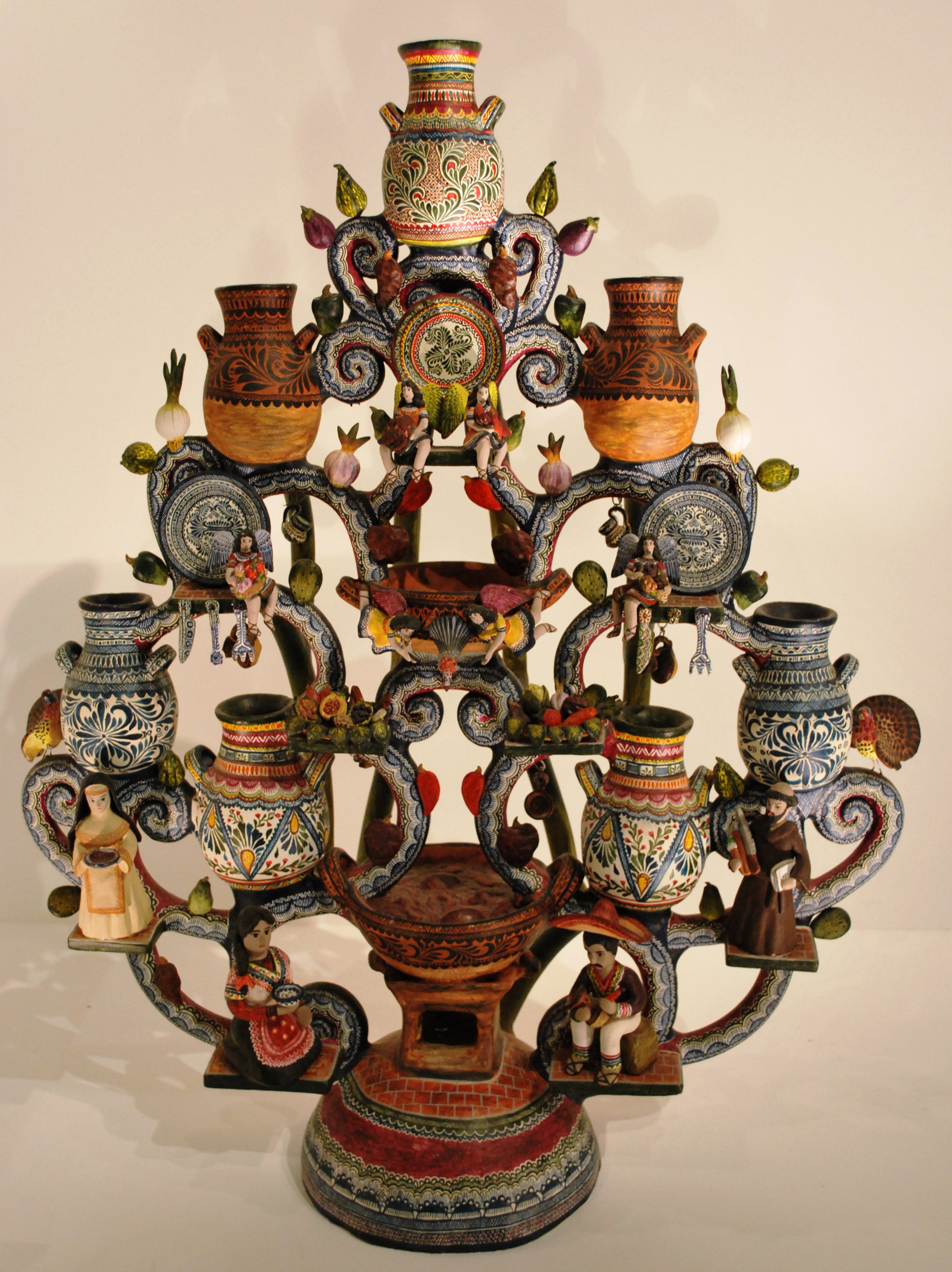
Tree with Talavera pottery theme

The craft is made in three principal areas: Metepec, Mexico State, Izucar de Matamoros, and Acatlan, both in Puebla, and most are made with commercial intent. In the old days, these were a traditional gift for newlyweds as a symbol of fertility and abundance. The craft is best preserved in Metepec, where craftsmen have received orders from countries such as China, Japan, France, Italy and Germany with a large number going to Spain. The best known potters in Metepec include Archundia, Tito Reyes, Modesta Fernandez, Macario Garduno, Paz Lopez, Claudio Tapia, Timoteo Gonzalez, Celso Rodriguez, Jose Sanchez de Leon, Lazaro and Manuel Leon. The government of the municipality of Metepec has sponsored courses in pottery and ceramics to keep the tradition alive.

However, the craft has been waning and may be in danger of extinction. On Comonfort Street in Metepec there are dozens of pottery workshops but only two of these remain making the trees. One major reason for this is cheap imitations, mostly imported from Asia. This has been a problem for many Mexican crafts, with the federal government stepping in to develop trademarks and "denomination of origin" for traditional crafts. In 2009, the Tree of Life was trademarked for artisans from Metepec and neighboring Calimaya, befitting the approximately 300 families that dedicate themselves to making them. In addition to authenticity, there are plans to use the trademark to promote the product internationally.

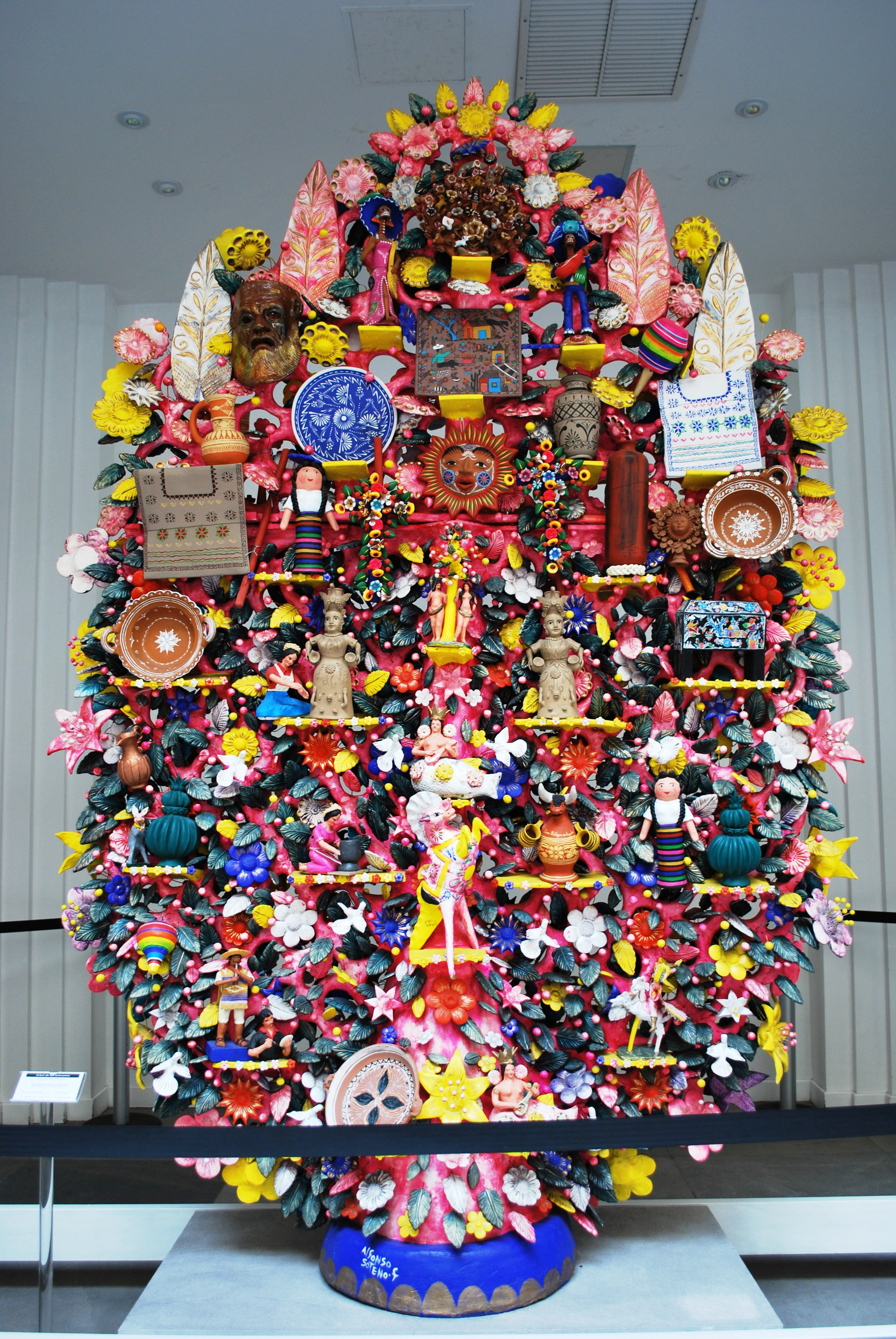
Tree of Life sculpture by Oscar Sotano on display at the Museum de Artes Populares in Mexico City

There is a national ceramics prize called the Concurso Nacional de Alfareria y Ceramica "Arbol de la Vida" presented each year by the municipality but entrants are not limited to trees of life. Pieces from various places in Mexico, such as Oaxaca, Jalisco and Guanajuato but most pieces are from Mexico State. There are categories for unfired pieces, pieces fired at low temperatures, pieces fired at high temperatures and glazed pieces. Each year representatives from the various indigenous communities of Mexico gather to form a human "Tree of Life." In 2006, 500 people from 63 different ethnic groups came to make the human pyramid, dress in native wear and calling for peace in the world. Some of the peoples represented include Zapotecs, Huastecs, Purépecha, Maya, Otomi, Tarahumara Huicholes and Yaquis.

However, other projects with similar ambitions, such as the Explanada Artesanal, have not experienced much success. The Explanada is dirty, lacks lighting and lacks visitors despite the authentic wares sold here. It is located on Hidalgo Street in Metepec with 95 stands that sell clay and ceramic crafts made in the municipality. Because of the lack of visitors, many of these stands are only open on the weekends. Vendors state that the problem is that the municipality does not support the park, by not providing services and by not promoting it.

== See also ==
- Adrián Luis González
