= Handcrafts and folk art in Michoacán =

Folk art

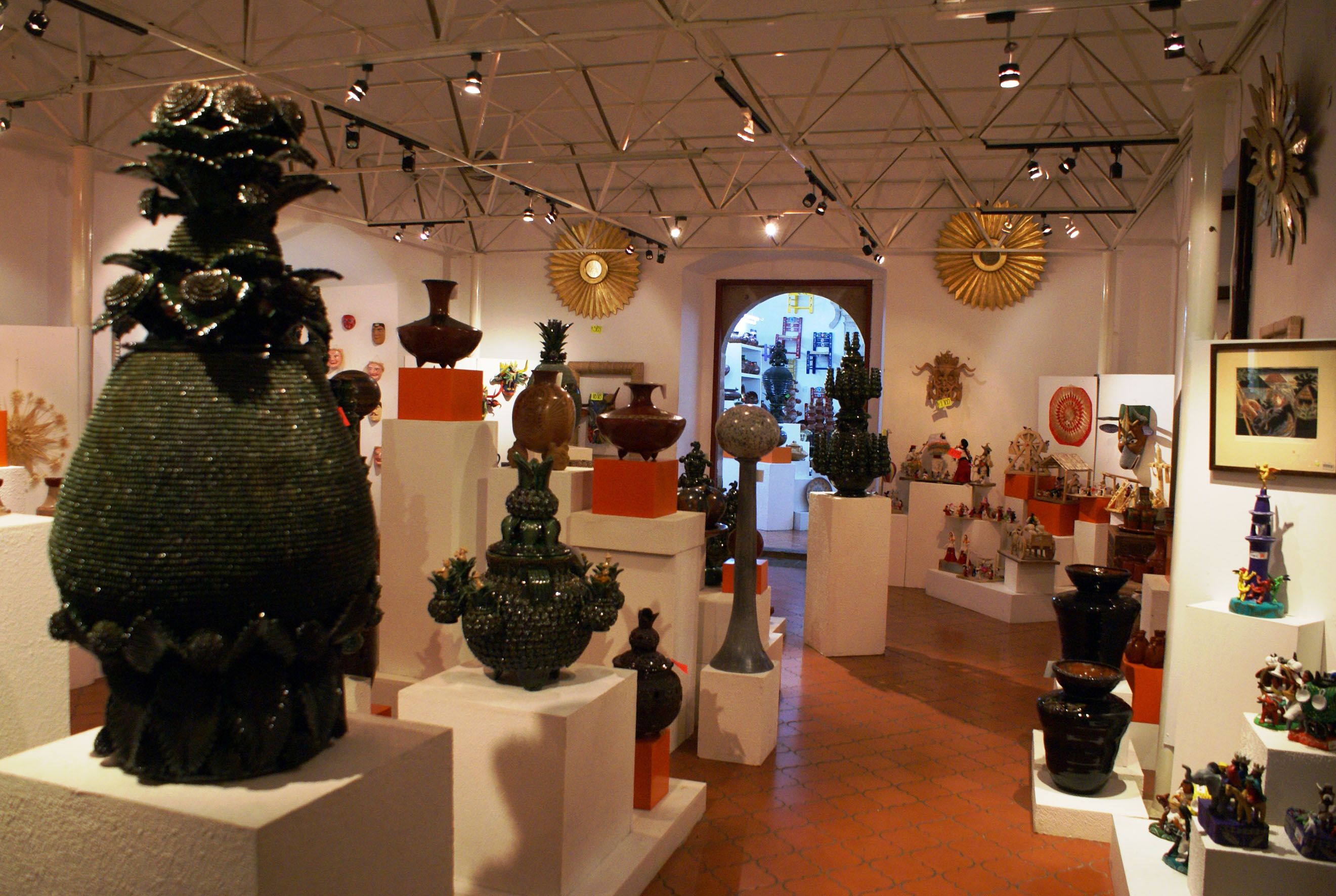
View inside the Casa de las Artesanias in Morelia

Michoacán handcrafts and folk art is a Mexican regional tradition centered in the state of Michoacán, in central/western Mexico. Its origins traced back to the Purépecha Empire, and later to the efforts to organize and promote trades and crafts by Vasco de Quiroga in what is now the north and northeast of the state. The state has a wide variety of over thirty crafts, with the most important being the working of wood, ceramics, and textiles. A number are more particular to the state, such as the creation of religious images from corn stalk paste, and a type of mosaic made from dyed wheat straw on a waxed board. Though there is support for artisans in the way of contests, fairs, and collective trademarks for certain wares (to protect against imitations), Michoacán handcrafts lack access to markets, especially those catering to tourists.

== History ==
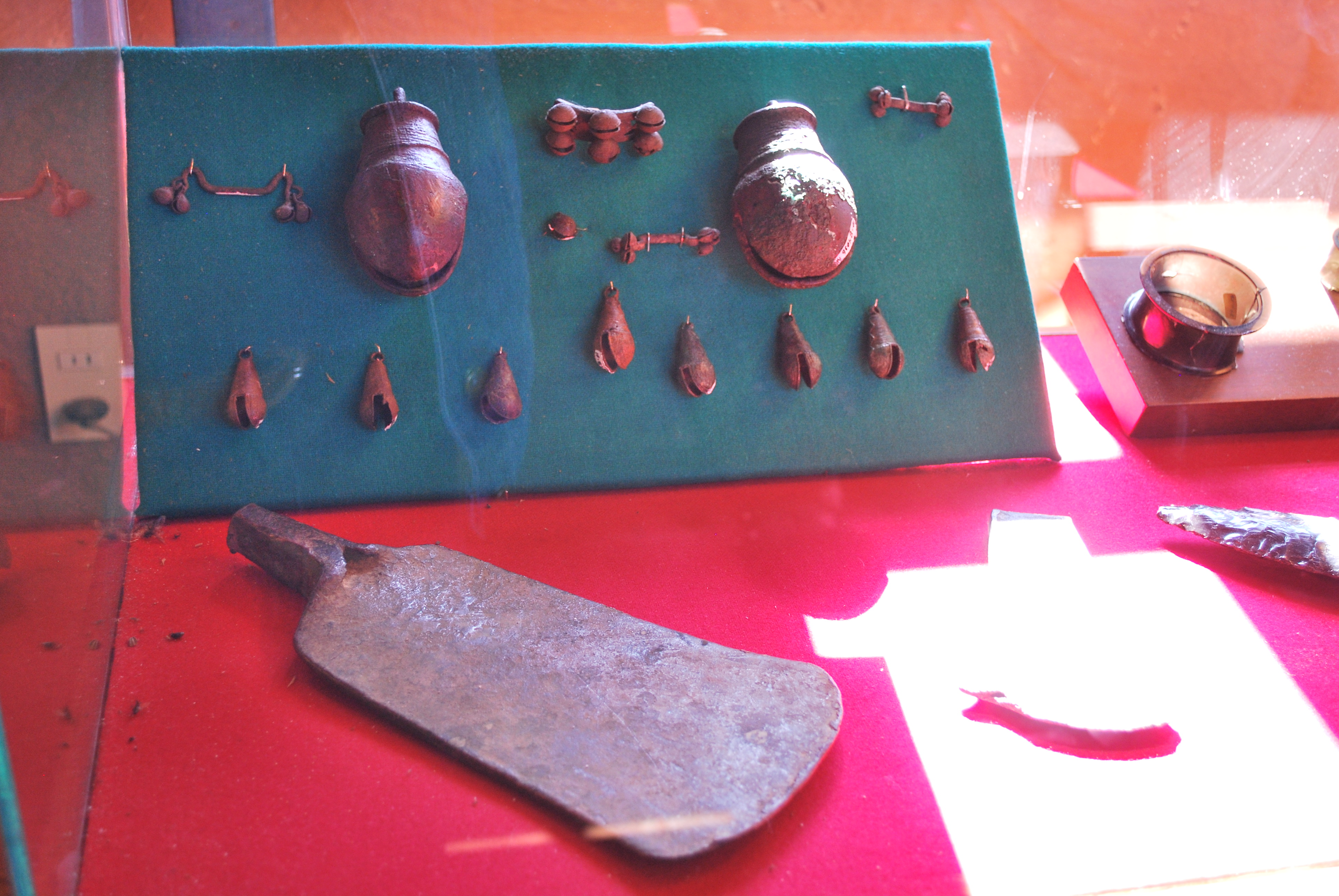
Copper and bronze implements on display at the site museum of Tzintzuntzan

Evidence of pre Hispanic craftsmanship, especially in ceramics, can be found in all parts of the state, but the most developed crafts traditions date from the Purépecha Empire, which centered on Lake Pátzcuaro and extended east to what is now the Michoacán border with the State of Mexico. Pre Hispanic centers of production included Cojumatlán, Zinapécuaro, Apatzingán, Tepalcatepec, Huetamo, Morelia and Cuitzeo as well as the coast and along the Balsas River .

The artisans with the highest social status were those who worked with metals and feathers, as well as those who worked with semi precious stones. The reason for this was that these artisan produced goods used by the ruling classes as well as offerings to the gods. Michoacán was one of Mesoamerica's major metal working centers, mastering hammering, metal coating and metal casting by the time the Spanish arrived. Most metal work was in gold, but the Purépecha had developed some copper work. Most of the products were ornaments for the ruling classes but some utilitarian items such as needles, fishhooks and hole punches were made. Luxury goods made with fine feathers was a particularly appreciated by Purépecha society. Goods such as caps, blankets, clothing, headdresses and ornamental staffs adorned with feathers were used only by priests and rulers as symbols of power and dignity. Artisans who made these objects had their own designation, “izquarecucha.” Purépecha stone work includes the working of turquoise and other semi precious stones along with obsidian. Most were used in adornments and offerings but obsidian was also used for agricultural tools of high economic value, weapons and sacrificial knives. Stoneworkers’ graves can be identified by their goods, which included their tools and raw materials.

Two other very important pre Hispanic handcrafts are textiles and ceramics, whose artisans could also be full-time and enjoy fairly high status. Purépecha weavers worked with white and brown cotton, as well as a rougher fiber from the maguey plant called ixtle. According to the Relación de Michoacán, an early colonial period document that describes Purépecha life before the Conquest, textile work was the purview of women, with skills passed down from generation to generation. The richest fabric had feathers or rabbit fur woven into the cotton, and pure white cloth was an easily traded commodity, used as a form of currency. Dyes were from natural sources such as insects and plants, and common colors included blue, black and red. Finished textile goods included shirts, caps, dresses, threads for tying headdresses and doublets worn by warriors.

Ceramics of the area are distinguished by technique, size, shape and decoration. Purépecha pottery is characterized by being polychromatic, in negative decoration using principally black, red and white. The best examples of this work come from the Lake Patzcuaro area. The quality and variety of the ware suggests that there was a class of full-time potters. Artifacts include bowls, pots and more including miniature versions of these as well as whistles, flutes and figures. Other important pre Hispanic ceramic areas include Zamora, Cojumatlán, Zanapécuaro, Apatzingán, Tepalcatepec, along the Balsas River, Huetamo, Morelia and Cuitzeo.

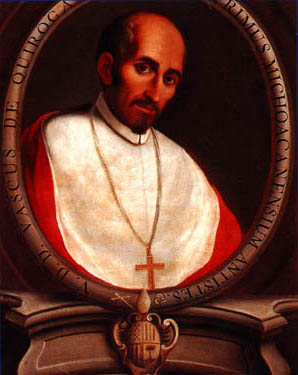
Vasco de Quiroga

After the Spanish conquest, new techniques and some new products were introduced to indigenous artisans. However, it was the efforts of Vasco de Quiroga, the first bishop of Michoacán that are responsible for most of the state's modern artisan practices.

When Quiroga arrived to the area, the political and economic situation was chaotic. His priorities were to revive the economy and evangelization. He based much of this effort in the former empire's long artistic tradition, after studying the needs and traditions of the people and the area's natural resources. He worked to improve the techniques of those that already existed such as pottery and weaving, and introduced a few new ones. Quiroga assigned certain crafts to certain towns such as the making of cotton goods to Ahuirán, wool and wood crafts to Aranza, pottery to Capula, the making of wood chests to Cocupao (today Quiroga), the making to petates to Coro, palm frond hats to Erongarícuaro, fishing nets to Janitzio, leather crafts to Ocumicho, musical instruments to Paracho, lacquered items to Pátzcuaro and cotton garments to Zitácuaro. This aims of this were to take advantage of each localities resources as well as to encourage trade. Quiroga concentrated his efforts in what was the Purépecha Empire, centered on Lake Patzcuaro and extending east to what is now the border of the state with the State of Mexico, where most of Michoacan's handcrafts are still made. His work was not always approved of by his clerical superiors, often being in contrast to their interests. However, he became well regarded by the indigenous of the region and is still referred to today as Tata (Grandfather) Vasco.

Since then, techniques and products have not changed very much although here has been some introduction of more modern methods such as the use of high-fire kilns and more modern techniques in the making of violins.

Vasco de Quiroga wasn't the only outsider to influence the artisan communities of Michoacan. James Metcalf brought new vigor to Santa Clara de Cobre, Steven and Maureen Rosenthal created a new industry of lacquered furniture in Erongaricuaro, and Mario Lopez developed lines of furniture and other decor items made of chuspata in Ihuatzio.

== Status ==
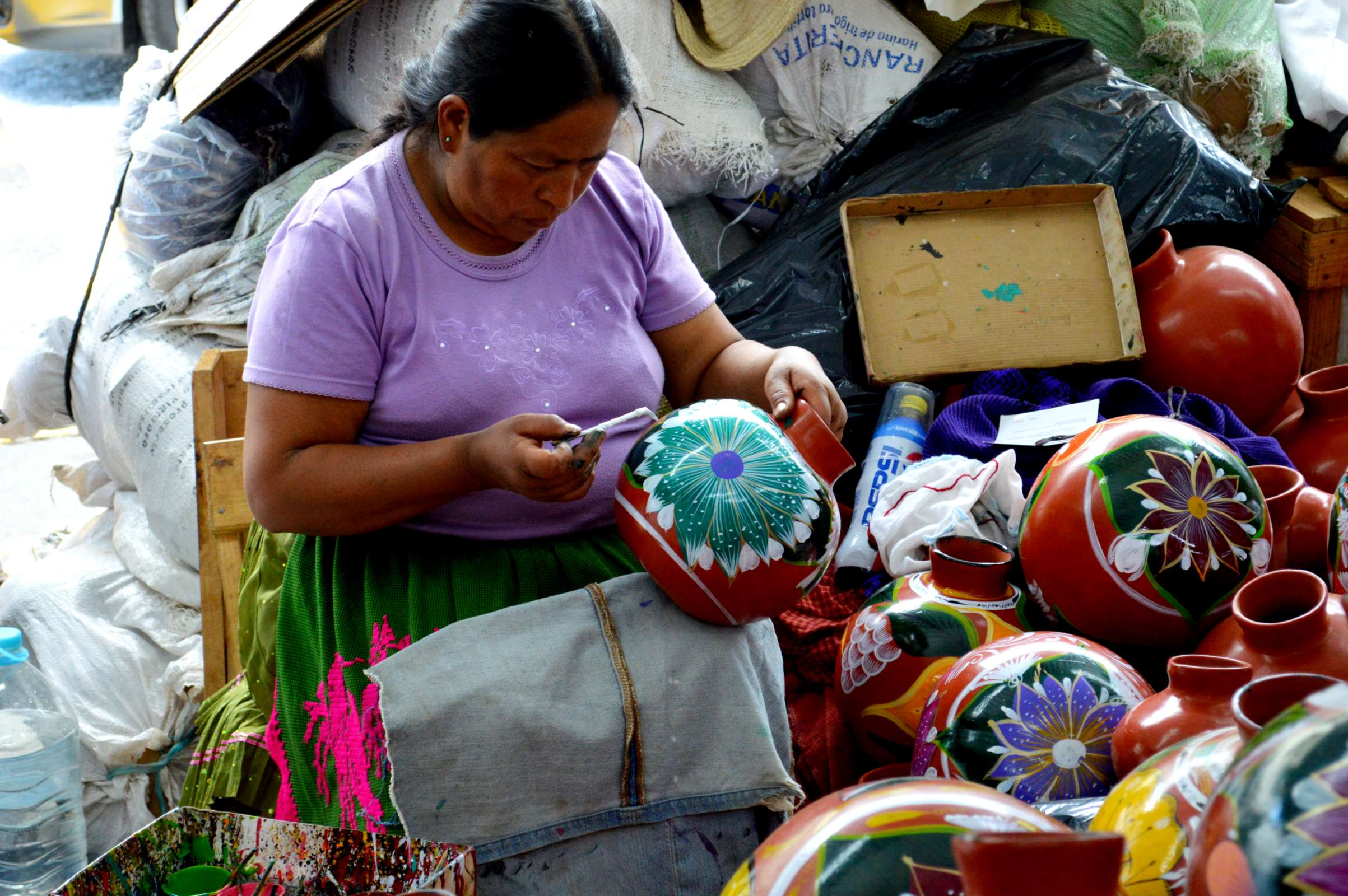
Woman painting pot at the Palm Sunday Handcraft Market in Uruapan

Michoacán is one of Mexico's major handcraft producers, with over thirty types including pottery, metal work, textiles, lacquer and wood working. The state has abundant natural resources as well as cultural and artistic traditions, a tendency to conserve traditions. Today, most pre Hispanic crafts still survive although many have been modified by the introduction of more modern methods and tools, from the colonial period and since.

There are six major crafts producing areas: Morelia, Pátzcuaro, Uruapan, Zamora and Lázaro Cárdenas . A number of communities are noted for their work. Patamban is one of the state's best known handcraft communities, recommended by the magazine México Desconocido as one of six to visit in Mexico for their handcrafts. It specializes in ceramics of various types such as natural (some decorated with fine painted lines), glazed and bruñido (burnished). The town's most famous artisan is Neftalí Ayungua Suárez also known as Tata Talli.

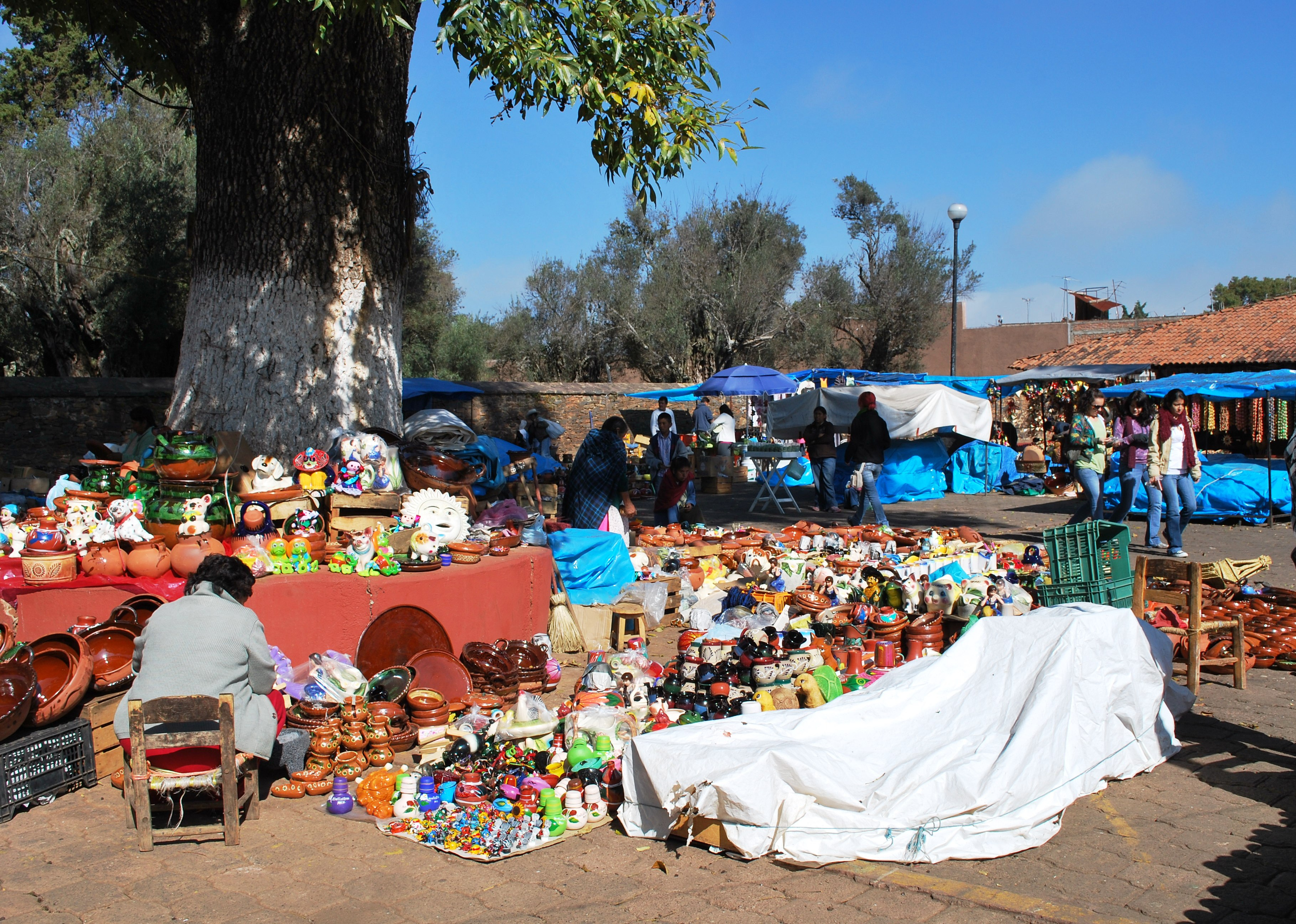
Crafts vendors in Tzintzuntzan

Most of the towns around Lake Patzcuaro have handcraft specialties. The city of Patzcuaro proper is known for a number such as ceramics and fine furniture, but it is also a regional economic center with many markets selling area handcrafts. It is also the home of the Museo de Artes e Industrias Populares (Museum of Popular Arts and Industries), located just south of the Basilica The building was originally constructed as the College of San Nicolás in the 16th century by Vasco de Quiroga to prepare young men for the priesthood and to teach Indian youth to read and write. It contains one of the largest collections of lacquered items, models, and other crafts.

One best known Lake Patzcuaro artisan community is Santa Clara del Cobre, where 82% of the population is employed in the making of hand hammered copper items. There are 250 registered workshops in and around the town, which process about 450 tons of copper each year, generating an income of about fifty million pesos. Many of the copper items made are of a utilitarian nature – cooking utensils, various types of containers, pots, pans, plates, shot glasses, clocks, jewelry, vases, beds, tables, chairs, light switches, counters, sinks, even bathtubs, and much, much more, all in copper. However, since the 1970s copper jewelry, and many other non-essential items has also been made here. The workshops here are family-owned with children learning the trade from their parents. There is also a cooperative school-workshop to teach copper smithing, named Vasco de Quiroga.

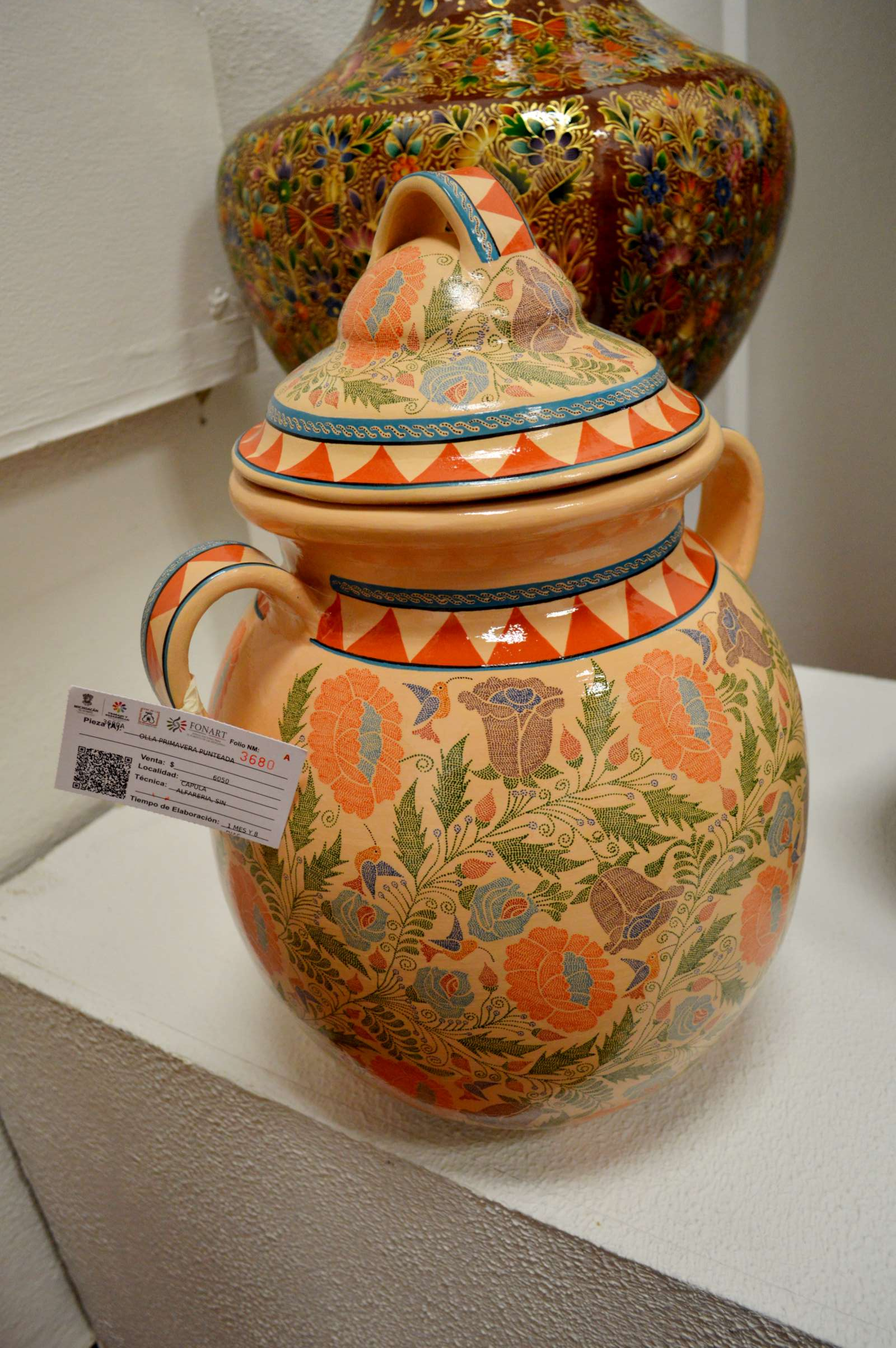
Pottery piece from Capula

The town of Capula is quiet colonial town located between Lake Patzcuaro and the city of Morelia. The most traditional is kitchenware such as pots and plates, which are decorated in small painted dots in a style known here as puntillaje, often to form flowers. This technique dates back to the clay pots from the pre Hispanic era. Since the 1980s, it has also been known for the making of ceramic images of La Catrina, a figure initially created by graphic artist Jose Guadalupe Posada. This began in the workshop of Juan Torres, who took the skeletal figure and made his own variations on the theme. Since then, most artisans in the town have turned to the making of these figures, some in more modern dress and even male versions called Catrinos. Capula attracts some tourists who come to see the demonstrations of how the wares are made. This small town is the only one in the state that boasts government certifications of origin for three of its products, punteada pottery, the Catrinas and a simpler pottery called loza tradicional.

In the eastern part of the state, near the border with the State of Mexico, is the town of Tlalpujahua. This community is known for Christmas ornaments that are blown from glass then hand-painted. This craft began after Joaquin Muñoz Orta returned from the United States, where he became familiar with the tradition of using glass balls to decorate trees. They began creating them in Mexico City but returned to his hometown to continue in 1964, where his business grew to make millions of the balls each year, exporting most. Today, the making of ornaments remains the main generator of employment for this area.

Horlando Horta working on a piece under a magnifying glass at the 2015 Feria Maestros del Arte

However, this varied handcraft tradition faces challenges. Like other areas of Mexico, handcrafted goods must compete against cheaper, commercially made products and cheaper imitations. One problem that many artisans have, especially those who sell more expensive items such as furniture, is the inability to extend lines of credit. Michoacan artisans lack access to markets to sell and avenues to promote their products. One main market to which these artisans lack access is the tourism industry, valuable to other states in Mexico such as Oaxaca. One important reason for the lack of tourism is security concerns. As of 2012 11,640 artisans worked in the state, but most have income below the poverty line.

There have been efforts by state and federal authorities as well as others to help preserve and promote the products of Michoacan's artisan. The federal government has authorized thirteen “collective trademarks” for certain types of handcrafts make in certain locales. These include the devil figures (diablitos) of Ocumicho, the ceramic pineapples of San José de Gracia, the ceramic pots of Zipiajo, the rebozos of Aranza, the stonework of Morelia, the traditional cookware of Capula, the Catrinas of Capula, the huanengos of and the ceramic pots of Terecuato, the copper work of Santa Clara del Cobre, the guitars of Paracho, the embroidery of Terecuato, the state's pieces done in pasta de caña de maiz and lacquered wood. The trademarks cover work done by about 2,000 artisans in the state, who employ about 5,000 others. The purpose of the trademarks is to guard against imitations and to help promote the products outside of Mexico. Michoacán ranks first in the country for the use of collective trademarks for handcrafts.

In 2014, the Comisión Nacional para el Desarrollo de los Pueblos Indígenas held its annual Expo Artesanía y Turismo Indígena in Morelia, with half of the exhibitions dedicated to the handcrafts of the indigenous peoples of the state.

In 2014, UNAM and the Colegio de Michoacán sponsored the first event to promote cooperation among academics and artisans of the state to preserve state traditions. The event is called Sueños (dreams) .

The main promoter of Michoacán handcrafts is the state-run Casa de las Artesanías (Casart), which opened a museum dedicated to the state's wares called the Museo Michoacano de las Artesanias in the historic center of Morelia. The museum is located in the former monastery of San Francisco just off Plaza Valladolid and has a permanent collection of over 1,100 pieces.

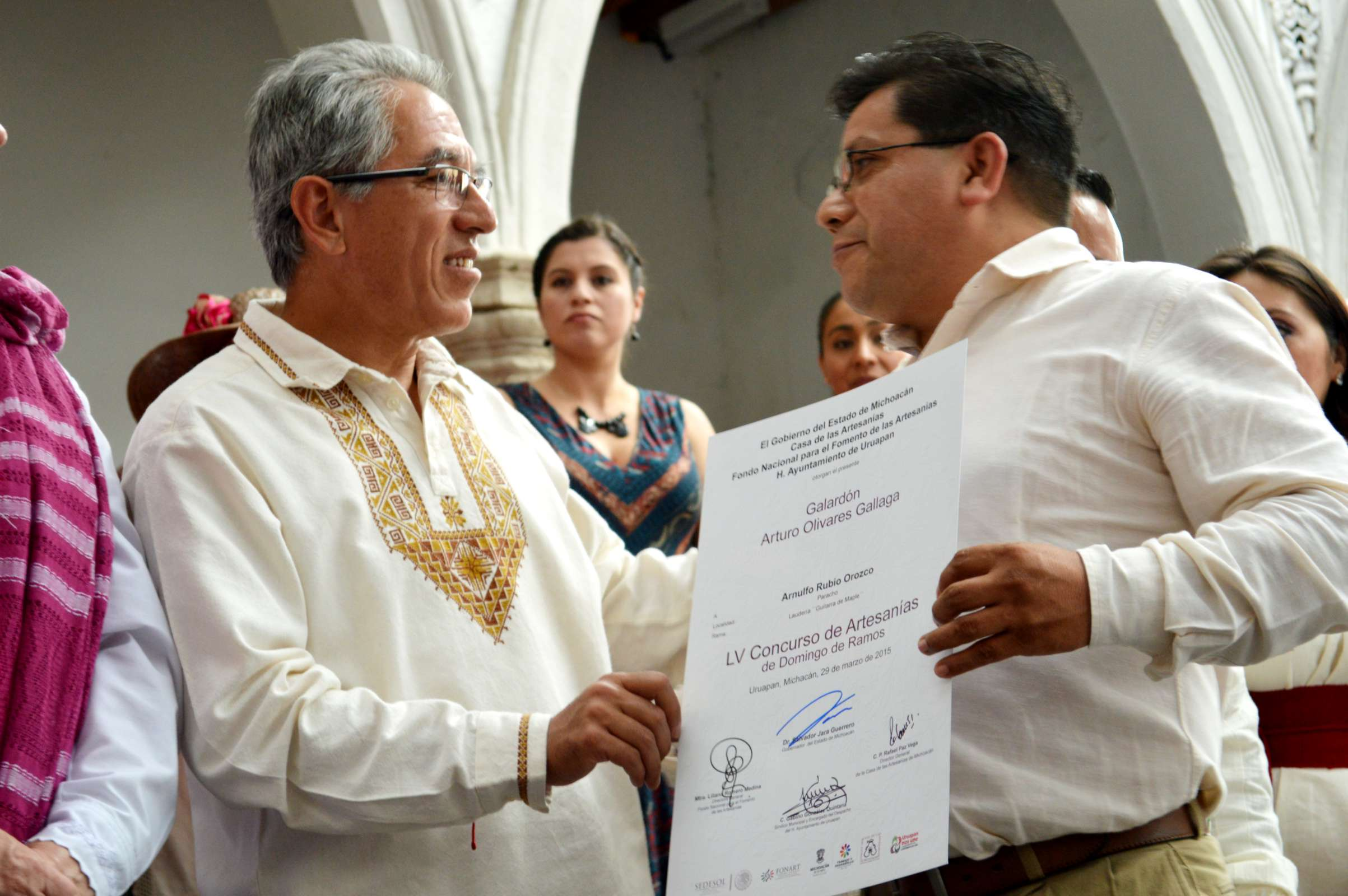
Governor of Michoacán congratulating artisan Arnulfo Rubio Orozco winning an award at the 55th annual state handcraft competition of the Tianguis de Domingo de Ramos in Uruapan

There are also local and state level fairs and contests with the aim of recognizing and promoting the work of the state's artisans. The Domingo de Ramos Crafts Fair in Uruapan is Michoacán's largest crafts fair and one of the biggest in Latin America. It features various crafts from all over the state. Other events include the Festival de la Artesanía in Charapan, the Concurso Artesanal de Patamban, . Fiesta Navideña in Morelia, Concurso Artesanal de Textiles in Algodón, Eréndira State Prize for the Arts, which gives a prize for the making of musical instruments, the Feria de la Silla, el Huinumo y la Costura in Opopeo, International Feria International de la Guitarra in Paracho, Feria Nacional del Cobre y Concurso del Cobre Martillado in Santa Clara del Cobre and the Feria de Mueble Rústico y Textile Bordado in Tingambato . Patzcuaro is well known for its Concurso Artesanal and artisan fair during the Dia de los Muertos holiday. Many villages known for handcrafts also have concursos during the time of their annual fiestas patronales.

== Pottery ==
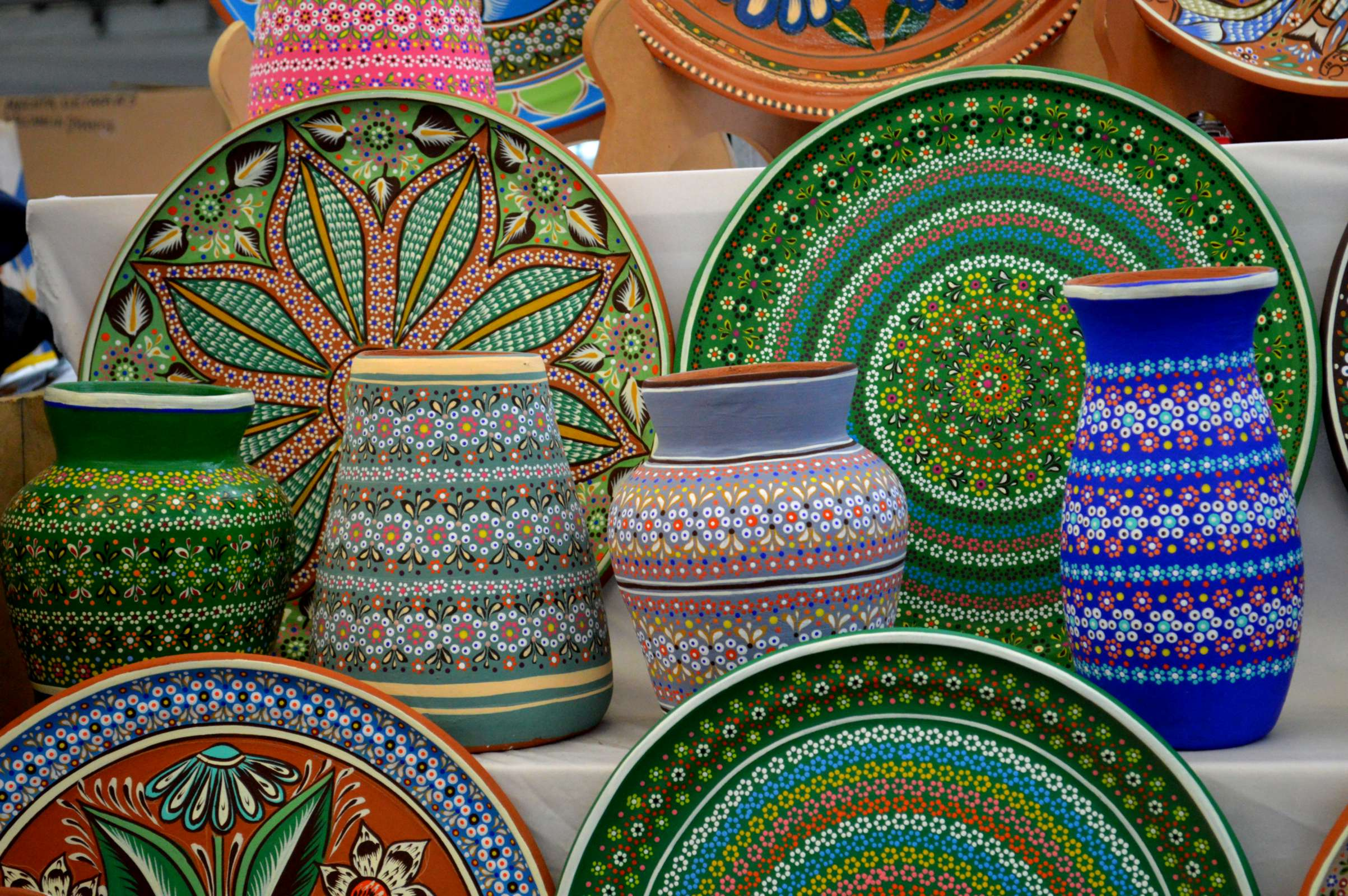
Colorful pottery with intricate hand-painted designs

Michoacán has numerous pottery-making communities with each region of the state having its own style as well as a number of towns. Noted pottery centers include Capula, Patamban, Cucuchucho, Santa Fe de la Laguna, Ocumicho, Uruapan, Tzintzuntzan and Patzcuaro. Some potters are full-time artisans but most also work as farmers or in other occupations. In general, the entire family works at the craft especially preparing the clay before molding. Modern pottery is made in burnished, multi-colored, high-fire, glazed and smooth finished, using a mix of European and indigenous techniques.

Indigenous pottery techniques that survive include barro bruñido or burnished pottery, which is not glazed but rather polished with a hard object, such as a stone, before firing. The most common object made with this technique is the water jug, and the best known communities for this work are Tzintzuntzan, Pataban, Zinapécuaro, Cocucho, Huáncito and Ichán. A simpler pottery is made in the Nahua communities on Michoacan's coast in communities such as Zipiajo, called barro alisado. This technique is used principally to make pots and comals .

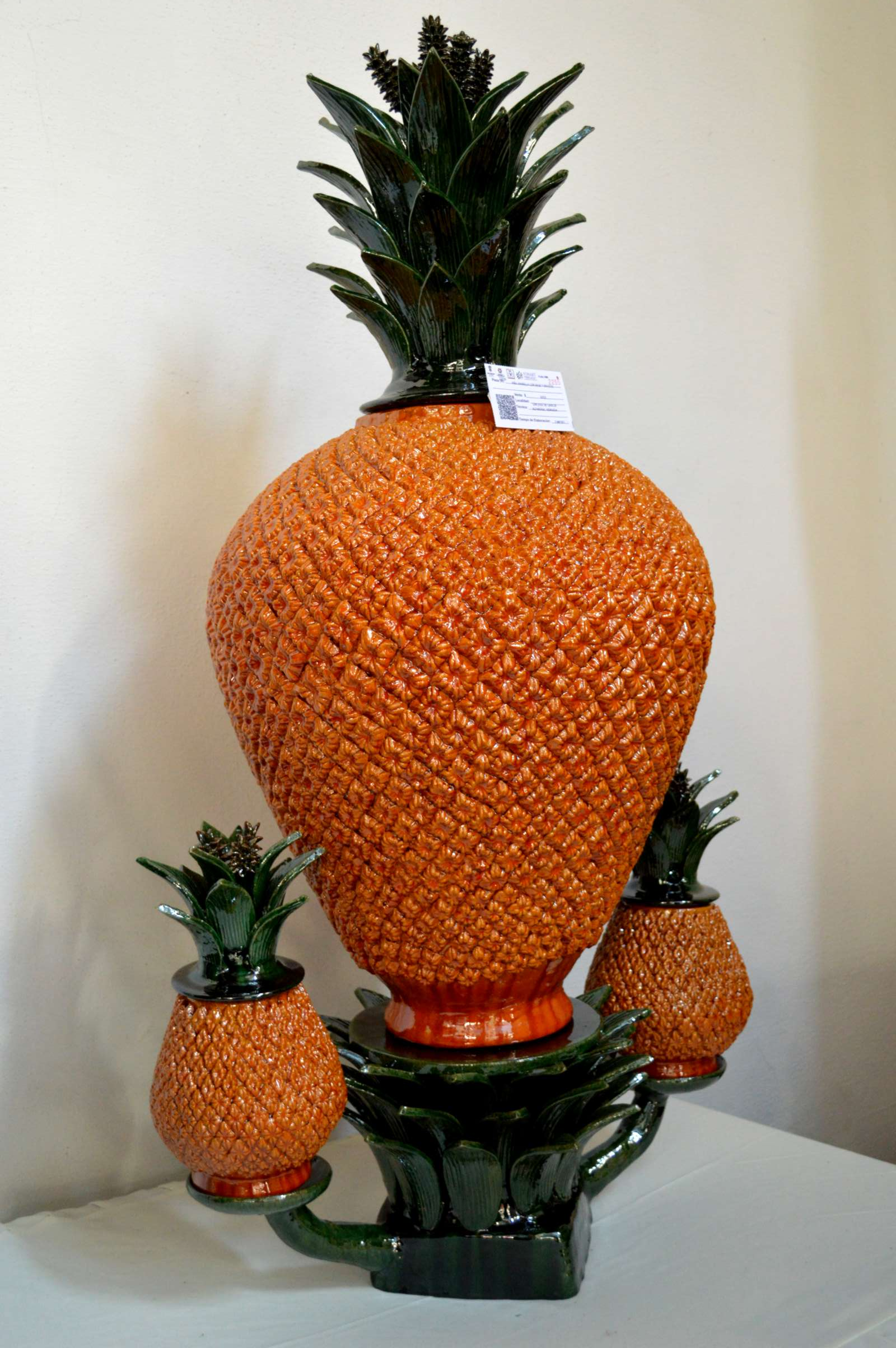
"Pineapple" pottery piece from San José de Gracia

Polychromatic pottery is made either by using different colored clay or through the use of paint. The most common object make with various colors are figures from the Bible and daily life and Christmas ornaments, especially in Ocumicho. One other unique figure from this town is a playful Devil, appearing in scenes such as the Last Supper or coming between two lovers. This last figure has a collective trademark.

The glazing of pottery was introduced in the colonial period, and since then various towns have developed their own styles. The best known traditional glazed pieces are the green glazed pottery of Patamban and that of Capula, which is decorated with numerous tiny dots of paint. Other notable communities include Tzintzuntzan for its pots and cazuelas, Santa Fe de la Laguna for its black incense burners and candle holders decorated with small pieces of clay along with Zinapécuaro, Santo Tomás and Huáncito, which all make drip glazed wares.

High fire ceramics are a more recent introduction to the state and are principally made in Patamban, Tzintzuntzan and Morelia. There are notable workshops of this type in other towns as well, such as that of Gustavo Bernal Varela in Tlalpujahua.

== Metals ==
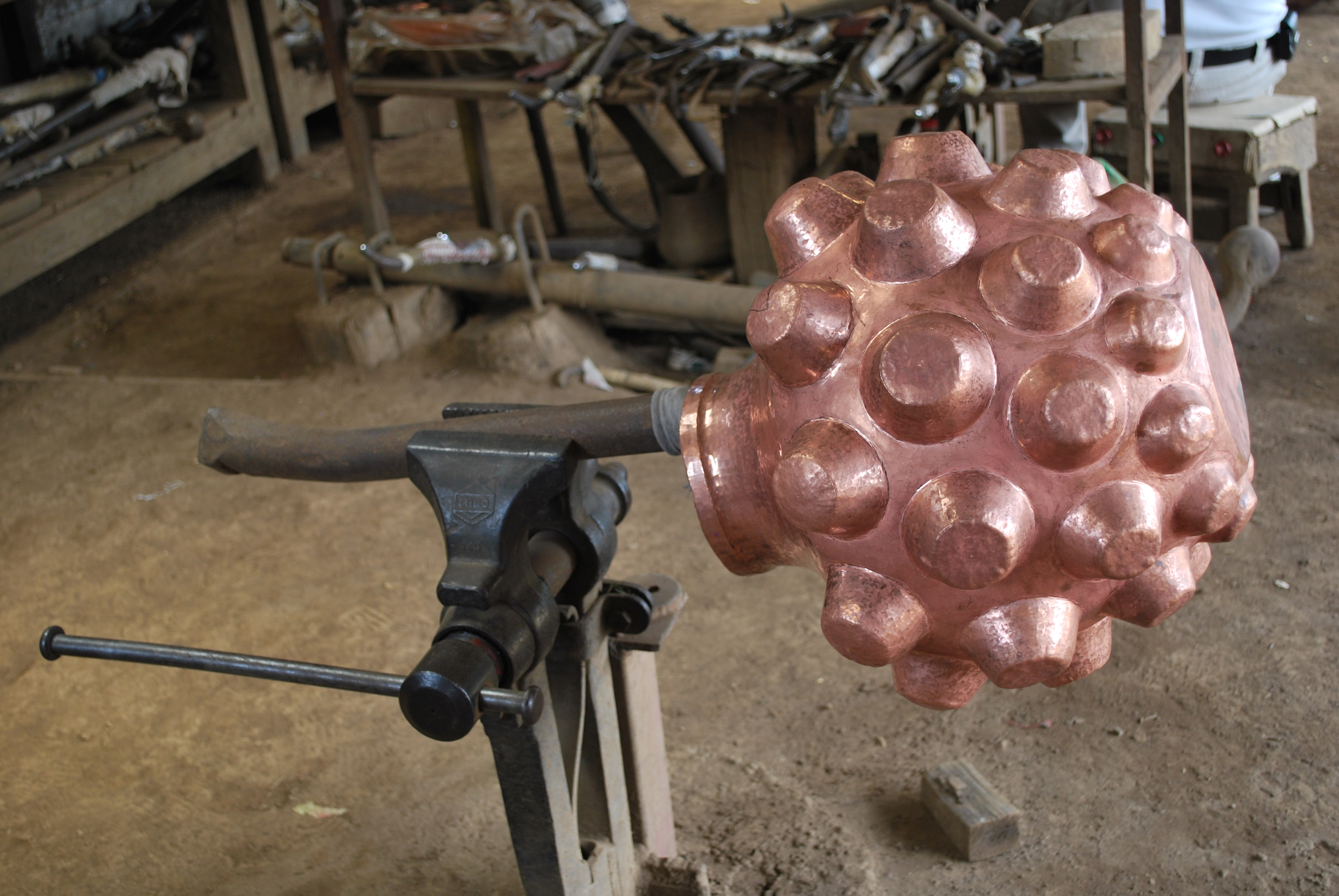
Copper piece in progress at the workshop of Abdon Punzó in Santa Clara del Cobre

Metalwork includes jewelry making, blacksmithing and hammered copper.

Jewelry and other items made of gold and silver are made in Morelia, Uruapan, Zitácuaro, San Lucas, Huetamo and Patzcuaro. One distinct type of silver work is the filigree work used to produce earrings among the Mazahua people that live in the eastern part of the state in municipalities such as Zitácuaro and Huetamo. This earring developed during the colonial period. It was originally used as a kind of engagement ring, with the prospective bridegroom earning various silver coins that he made into the earrings. The tradition waned in the 20th century but there have been efforts to bring this silverwork back.

Other work in fine metals include half-moon flat and pendant earrings made in Cherán, earrings and necklaces called “caricas” in gold in Uruapan. In Patzcuaro silver is carved into orbs and combined with hollow drops, coral and medallion as well as fine silver wires with tiny fish. In Tlalpujahua silver is worked, along with brass and iron.

The most famous modern metalwork of the state is the hammered copper of Santa Clara del Cobre, founded in 1530 as a smelter for the nuns of the order of Saint Claire. The foundry is gone but the work in the metal continues, with the making of copper tubs, vats, ladles, trays, sinks, basins, kegs, vases, pots, plates, jars, jewelry and more. Nearly all the copper used is from recycled materials. All are made by hand, using only hand tools such as mallets, hammers, sledge hammers, anvils and chisels, which work metal heated in wood fired furnaces. Each year the artisans show off their handwork at the Feria Nacional del Cobre.

== Wood ==
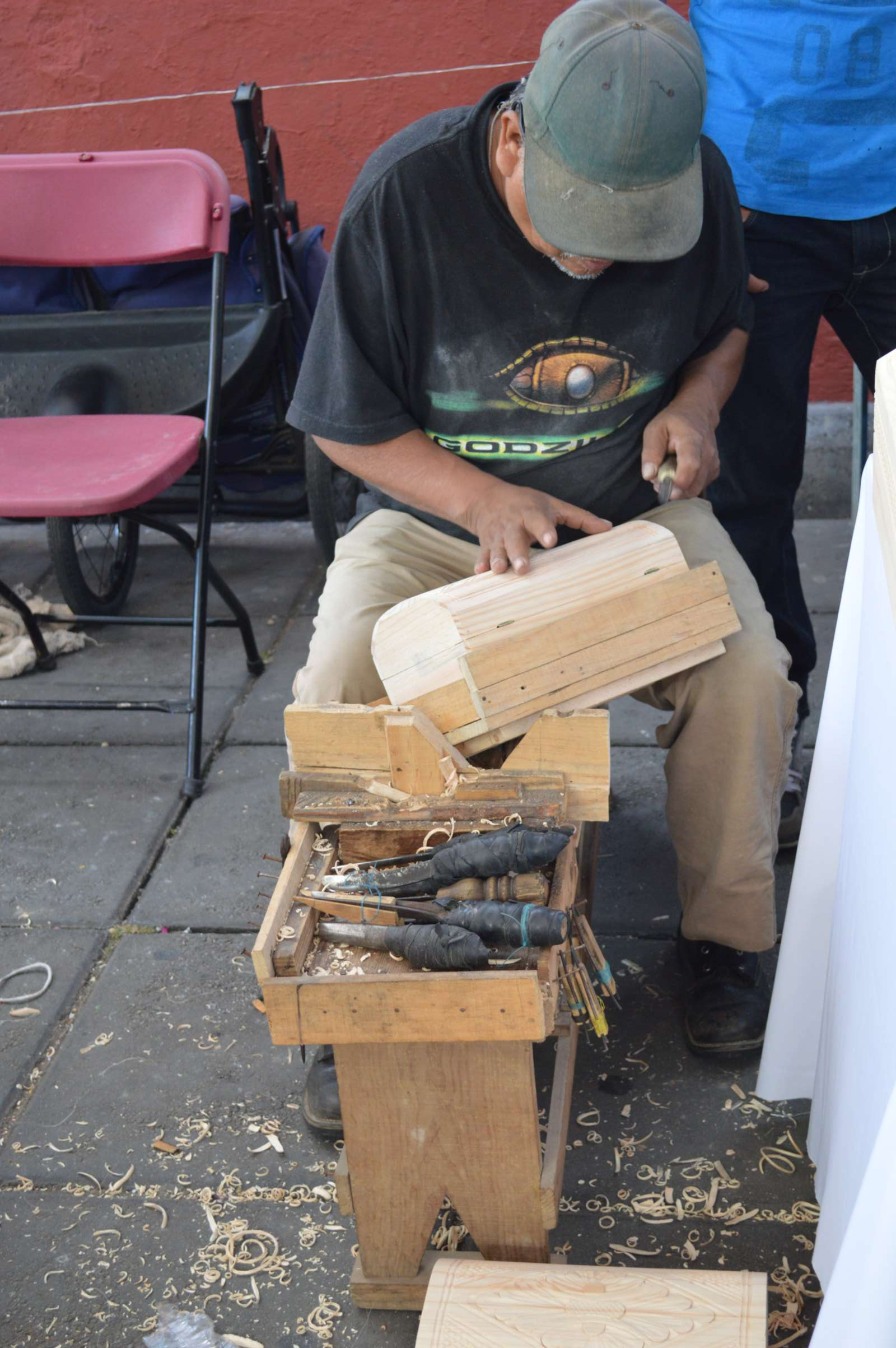
Artisan carving wood box at the Tianguis de Domingo de Ramos

The temperate and tropical forests of the state provides of the state's main economic resources, mostly managed by indigenous and mestizo groups providing both material and fuel. The wood varies greatly and includes fir, palo escrito, rosewood, pine, cirimo, mahogany, white cedar, tepamo, tecote, walnut, granadillo and galeana. The wood used by workshops in many small communities translate into one of the main sources of employment in the state. The wood is sculpted and carved into figures, toys, cooking implements, decorations and masks, as well as turned into lumber for furniture, and finer pieces for the making of musical instruments. Individual artisans create each piece from selecting the wood to polishing the final product. These products can be found in markets and stores, especially in areas with a large indigenous population. Patzcuaro and Uruapan are particularly noted for wood working.

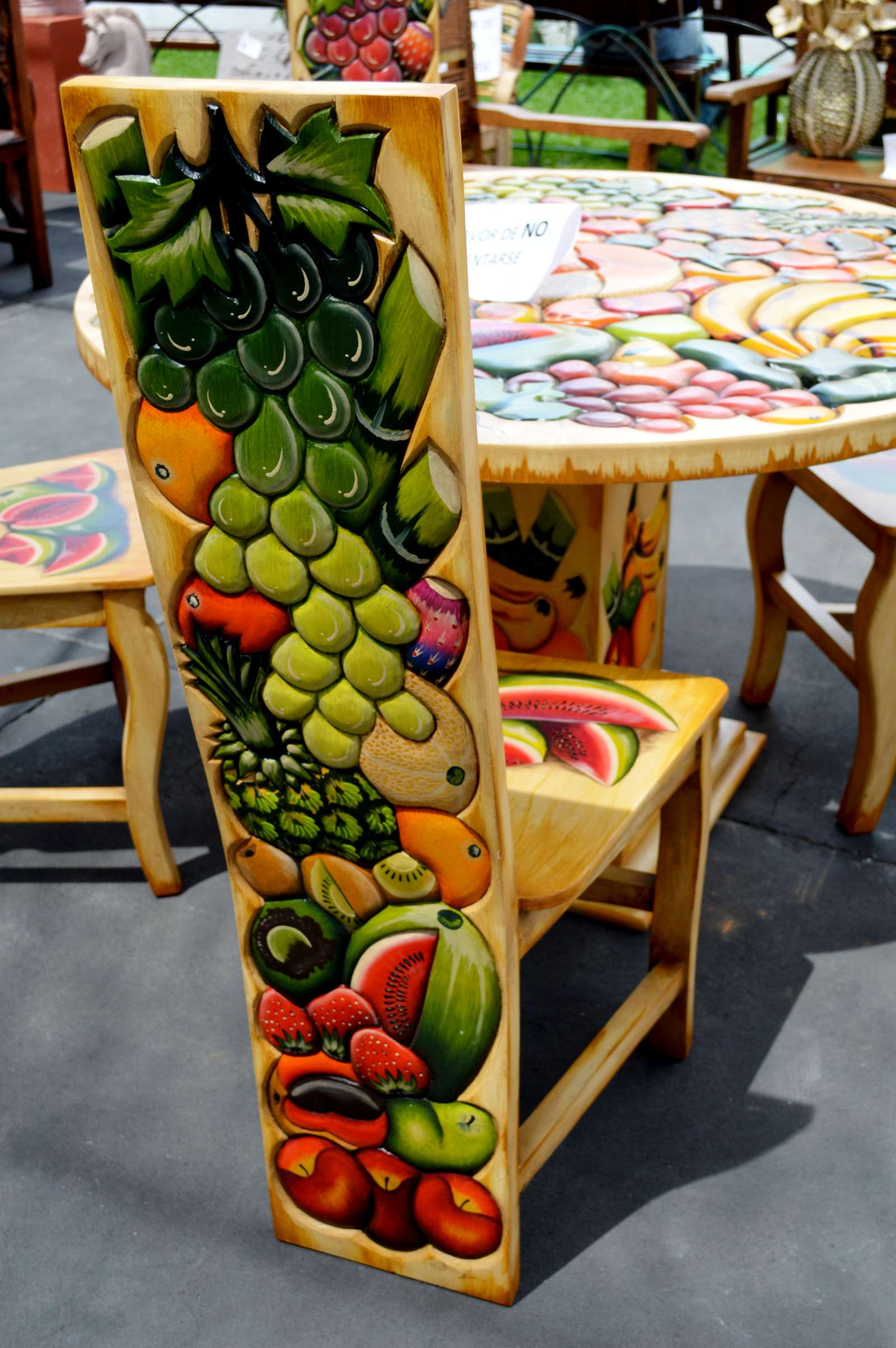
Carved and painted dining room chair from Cuanajo

Handmade furniture ranges in style from traditional Mexican rustic to fine pieces in European style. Furniture making centers include Capacuaro and Comachuén, who make chairs, dining room sets and beds—and Arantepacua and Turícuaro, who make chests of drawers and benches. Patzcuaro makes higher-end furniture in colonial and other antique styles. Erongarícuaro makes trunks and dining room sets and Tócuario is known for furniture made from Mexican walnut (parota) . Cuanajo makes furniture in white pine such as cupboards, hairs, trunks, spoon holders and headboards.

Various types of wood are used to make a number of musical instruments such as guitars, violins, violas, cellos, contrabasses and large guitars, especially in Paracho, Ahuiran, Aranza, Cheranástico, Nurío and Paracho, which hosts the Feria de la Guitarra. An individual artisan completes the entire task from start to finish.

Many of the wood carving activities are related to the making of items for religious purposes. These include images and masks, which are used for processions and dances. The use of masks dates back to the pre Hispanic era and today are used for dances such as Moors and Christians, the Devils, the Little Blacks, Los Viejitos, the Ranchers, the Hermits the Maringuias (men in women's dress) and Cúrpites (which means “eat together”). Utilitarian items include spoons, trays and shallow bowls, some of which are elaborately decorated.

== Textiles ==
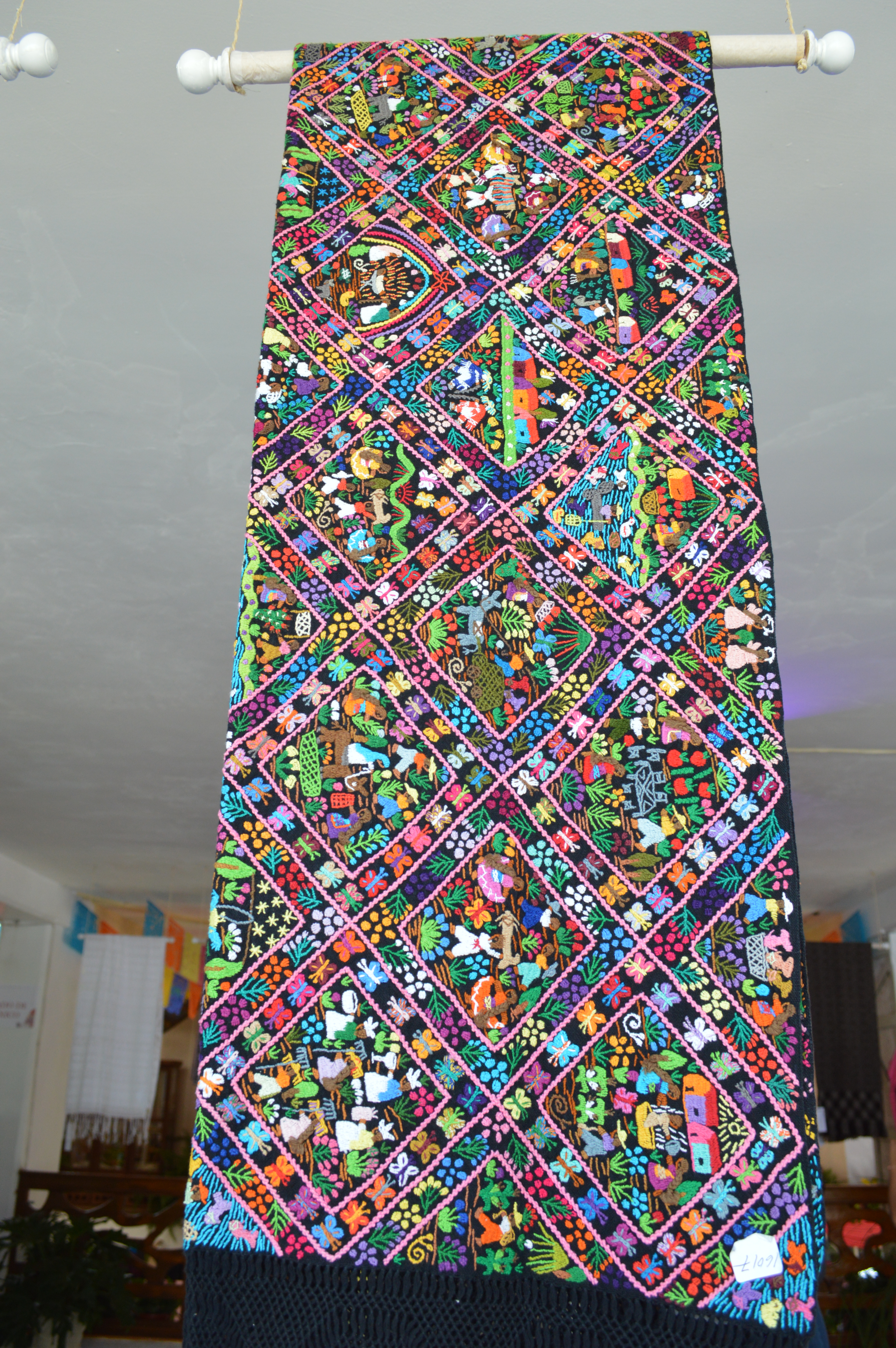
Heavily embroidered rebozo by Maria Cristina Barriga of Tzintzuntzan at the Feria de Rebozo in Tenancingo

Textile production in Michoacan includes embroidery, back strap and foot-pedal loom weaving, and crochet. Weaving dates back to the pre Hispanic period, when cotton, ixtle and even feathers and rabbit were used to create cloth and other textiles. All weaving was done on back strap looms, and the relatively narrow cloth stitched together when wider pieces were need to items such as huipils and blankets. The Spanish brought sheep and wool was added alongside the native fibers. They also introduced the framed pedal loom, which allows the creation of wider, thicker and longer pieces. The arrival of the Spanish also introduced new designs, such as horses appearing in weavings. Textile work is still passed on from generation to generation in indigenous communities in the state and is an important source of income for these families.

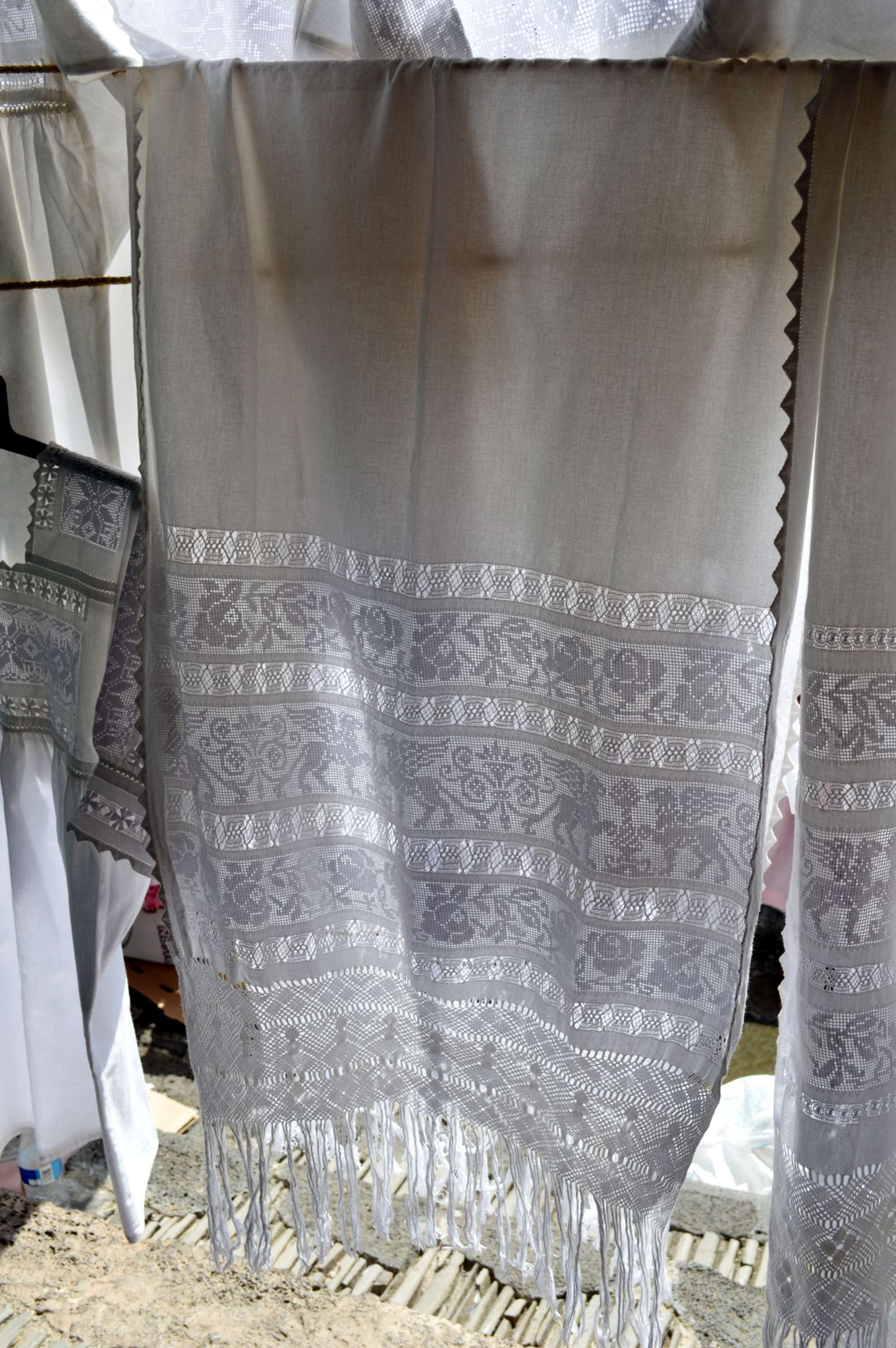
Fine rebozo with embroidery and "deshilado" technique, where threads are removed and the remaining tied into designs

In Michoacán, women weave on back strap looms as they did in the pre-Hispanic period with most weaving on pedal looms done by men. Sheep are generally shorn twice a year, spring and fall, with the wool obtained in each season requiring different handling because of the types of impurities found. Most wool is white but brown and black is found as well. Wool textile products include sarapes, wrap belts, rebozos, rugs and blankets. Cotton is spun and woven mostly to create clothing and linens—including dresses, shirts, blouses, jackets, tablecloths, table runners, napkins, and bedspreads. The most representative work in cotton comes from Patzcuaro and Uruapan, as well as Zacán and Tócuaro. Other notable cotton work is that of the Nahuas in the coastal areas. These textiles tend to be the most traditional, as they are made for self-consumption, with the pieces created from the growing of the cotton to weaving the cloth to sewing and embroidering the garment. The two towns best known for this work are Cachán and Maruata.

A number of communities are noted for weaving. El Jorongo is one of these, for items made both on back strap and pedal looms. Back strap and pedal looms are used in the Nahua coastal areas and the Mazahua mountain areas of the state for both everyday and festive wear. The finest woven products of both wool and cotton are made in Patzcuaro, Uruapan and Zamora, producing rebozos, other traditional clothing, and linens. Wool items are woven on backstrap looms is only done in the Purepecha region and part of the Mazahua region in the eastern part of the state. Angahuan is noted for its rebozos, blankets, echequemos, ruanas and heavy fabrics with images of birds, flowers and geometric patterns. Heavy jackets are made in Pichátaro, Santa Clara del Cobre, Cherán, Comachúen, Macho de Agua, Nahuatzen, Sevina and Charapan. In Tarecuato, backstrap looms create wool belts and in Cuanajo, they make pouches, belts and more in a “dog leg” pattern. In Boca de la Cañada, Crescencio Morales and Macho de Agua, rebozos, cobijas, jackets, carrying bags and more are created with fabric made on backstrap looms, with elements such as stars, fretwork and deer. The rebozo is an important traditional garment, which has regional variations. Those of blue and white over black background are woven in Ahuiran and Angahuan.

Ixtle (maguey) fiber is still worked to create utilitarian items such as knapsacks and carrying bags, which in Santa Cruz Tanaco and Tarecuato are generally undyed. In Pómaro, Ostula, el Naranjito and Cachán the same fiber is used for larger bags used to carry pitchers and cobs. Ixtle thread is also used to embroider leather items such as hats, bridles, reigns, cinches. In Paracho, this fiber is dyed before being worked.

Embroidery and other decorative needlework are done by women and are one of the most common handcrafts done in the state. These have origins in the pre Hispanic period although various techniques have since been added. Embroidering of blouses and guanengos (Michoacan style huipils) can be done in openwork, straight stitching, cross-stitch and tucks. San Felipe de los Herreros is particularly noted for this work, as well as Zacán Tócuaro, Erongarícuaro, Tarecuato and Angahuan.

Embroidered as well as woven designs can indicate where an item is from. Rebozos de bolita (tiny balls) is a style of rebozos from La Piedad and Zamora. Items from Tarecuato, Cocucho and San Felipe de los Jerreros are distinguished by the heavy use of tiny cross stitch.

== Stiff plant fibers ==
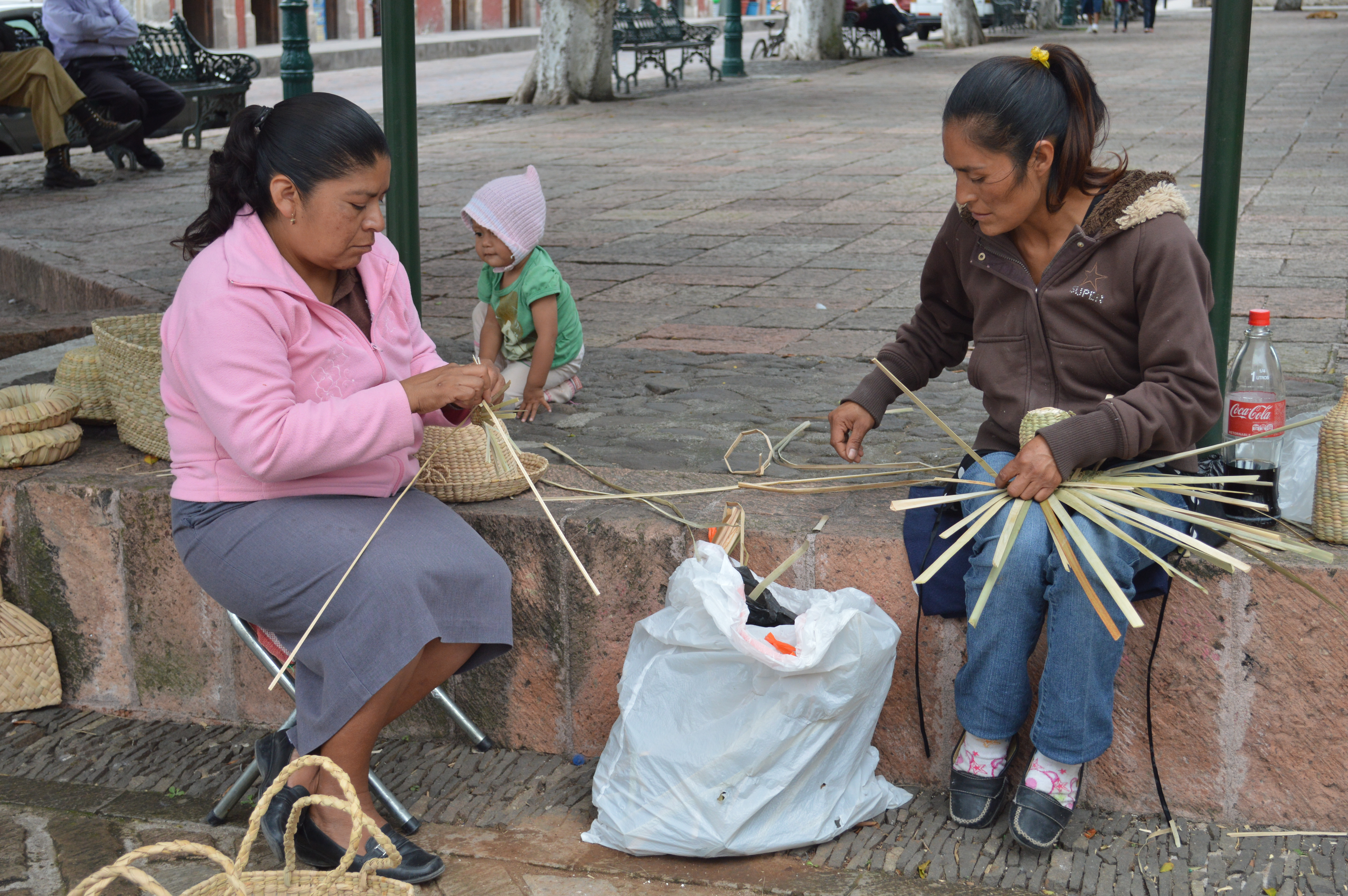
Women weaving baskets in Cuitzeo

Stiffer plant fibers include reeds, bulrushes (chuspata), corn husks, corn stalks, wheat straw, palm fronds and willow branches. Most of this work is done by women, who twist, weave and glue the fibers together to create various kinds of items, in town such as Ario de Rosales, Patzcuaro, Erongarícuaro, Quiroga and Tzintzuntzan.

One craft particular to the state is “pasta de caña,” literally “corn stalk paste.” It is a technique created by the Purépecha to create lightweight images of their gods. After the Conquest, it was then turned to making lightweight Catholic images for use in processions. It is the bundling of inner corn stalk along with the making of a paste from the same material, which is then sculpted to the desired image, which when finished, is as smooth as one made of ceramic, but considerably lighter. Today, the craft is mostly practiced in Patzcuaro.

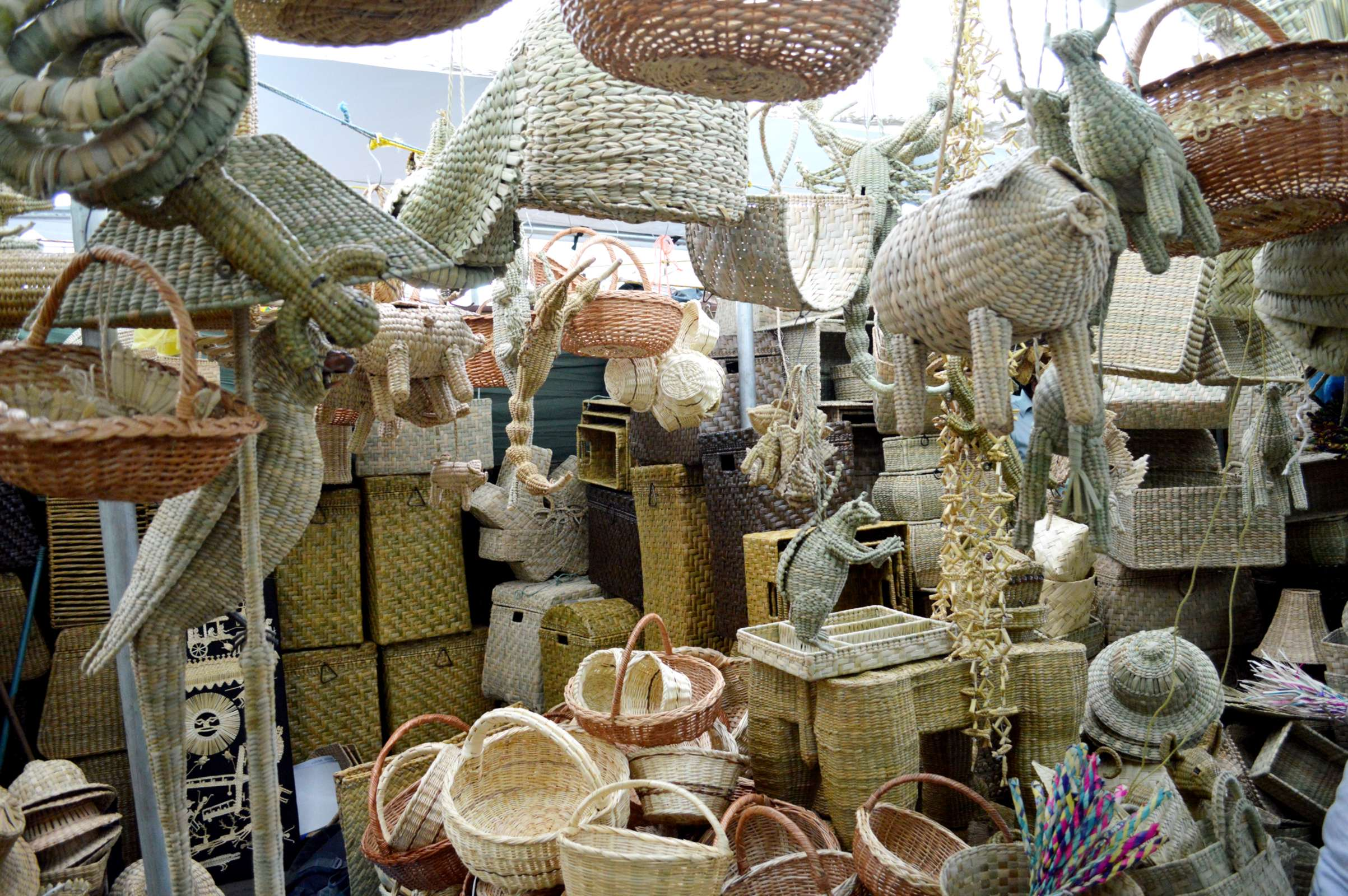
Baskets and similar products at the Tianguis de Domingo de Ramos

Another material used in Michoacan is wheat straw, introduced when the Spanish introduced the grain. The straw is bundles and tied together to create figures and other objects such as images of Christ and the Virgin Mary for altars, Christmas ornaments, hats, baskets, table mats and screens, especially in Ichupio, San Jerónimo Purenchécuaro, San Andrés Tziróndaro and Tzintzuntzan.

More particular to Michoacán is the use of the same material, previously dyed in various colors, to create a kind of mosaic. Individually cut pieces of straw are carefully placed one-by-one pressed into a wax-covered board to create images. This manner of using wheat straw has roots in the pre-Hispanic period, when different materials where arranged with the same technique, but the current version, generally done to create religious images and landscapes has been popular since the 1960s. This craft is mostly found in Tlalpujahua.

Dried corn husks have long been used to create dolls and other figures. More recently other items such as crowns, bells, nativity scenes and Christmas ornaments and decorations have been added. This is a common craft in Tzintzuntzan, where the husks are often dyed yellow and indigo blue.

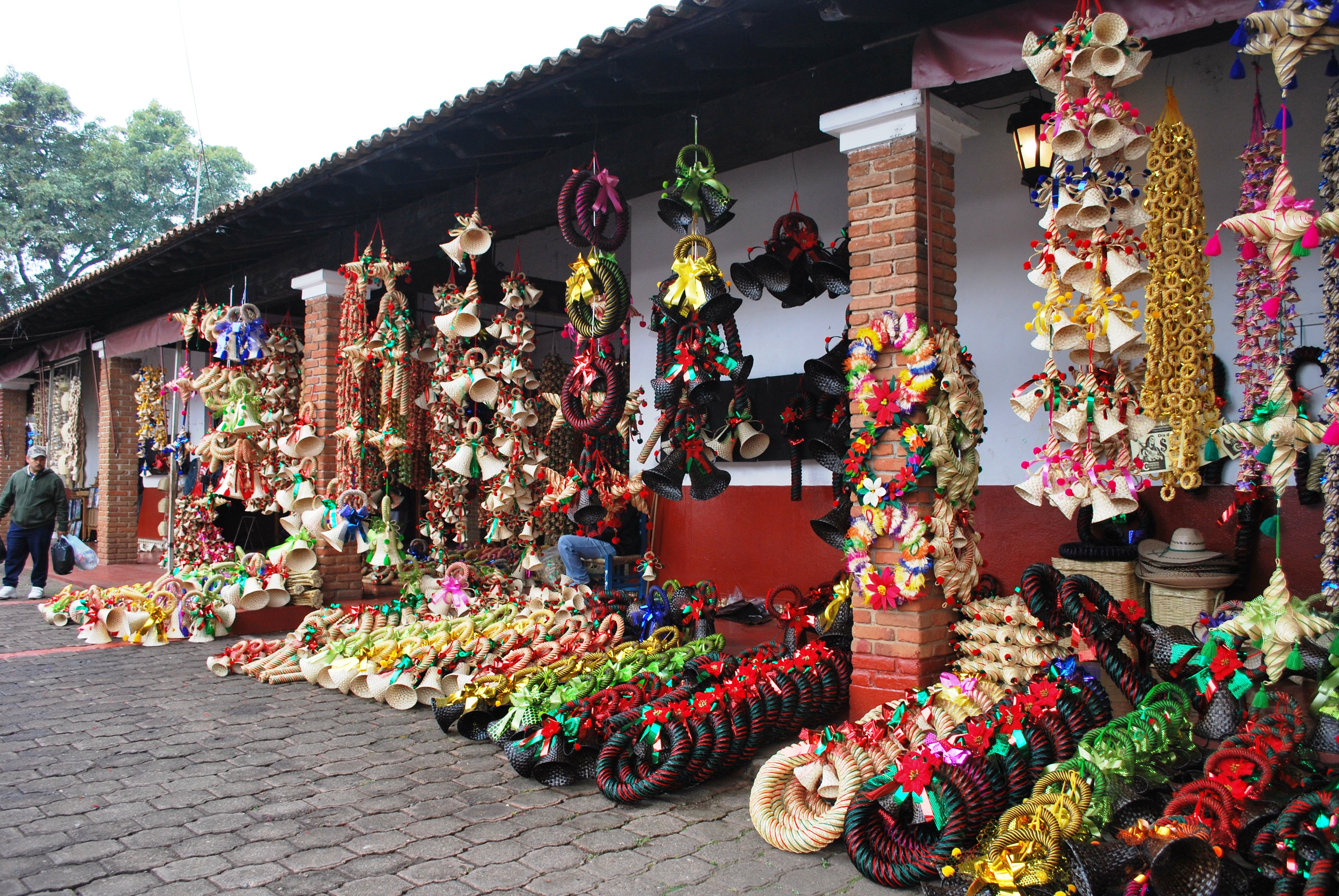
Wheat straw Christmas ornaments on display in Tzintzuntzan

Working with palm fronds was introduced by the Spanish and developed during the colonial period.One major item made from the fronds are hats, with each region developing its own size and shape. Particularly noted for their hats are the communities of Jarácuario, Zacán and Urén (Cañada de los Once Pueblos). Other items made from fronds include purses, folders and tortilla baskets.

In the Lake Patzcuaro and Lake Cuitzeo areas, reeds and bulrushes have been used to make a variety of products. One is the petate, a floor mat used in the pre Hispanic period for sleeping and still used in a number of indigenous communities. In Ichupio, Puácuaro and San Jerónimo they make also baskets, purses, tablecloths, tortilla baskets, floor coverings and a variety of decorative figures, especially birds and those representing daily life in the area. The raw material is generally collected from the lakeshore and woven in family workshops. In San Lucas Pío, reeds are used to make hampers and baskets. In Irancuartaro, men use it to make baskets for household use as well as heavy-duty ones for picking strawberries and corn. Women weave miniatures with the same materials.

Willow branches are used in Uripitío and San Juan Buenavista to make baskets, hats, wastebaskets and chests depending on thickness.

== Lacquered items ==
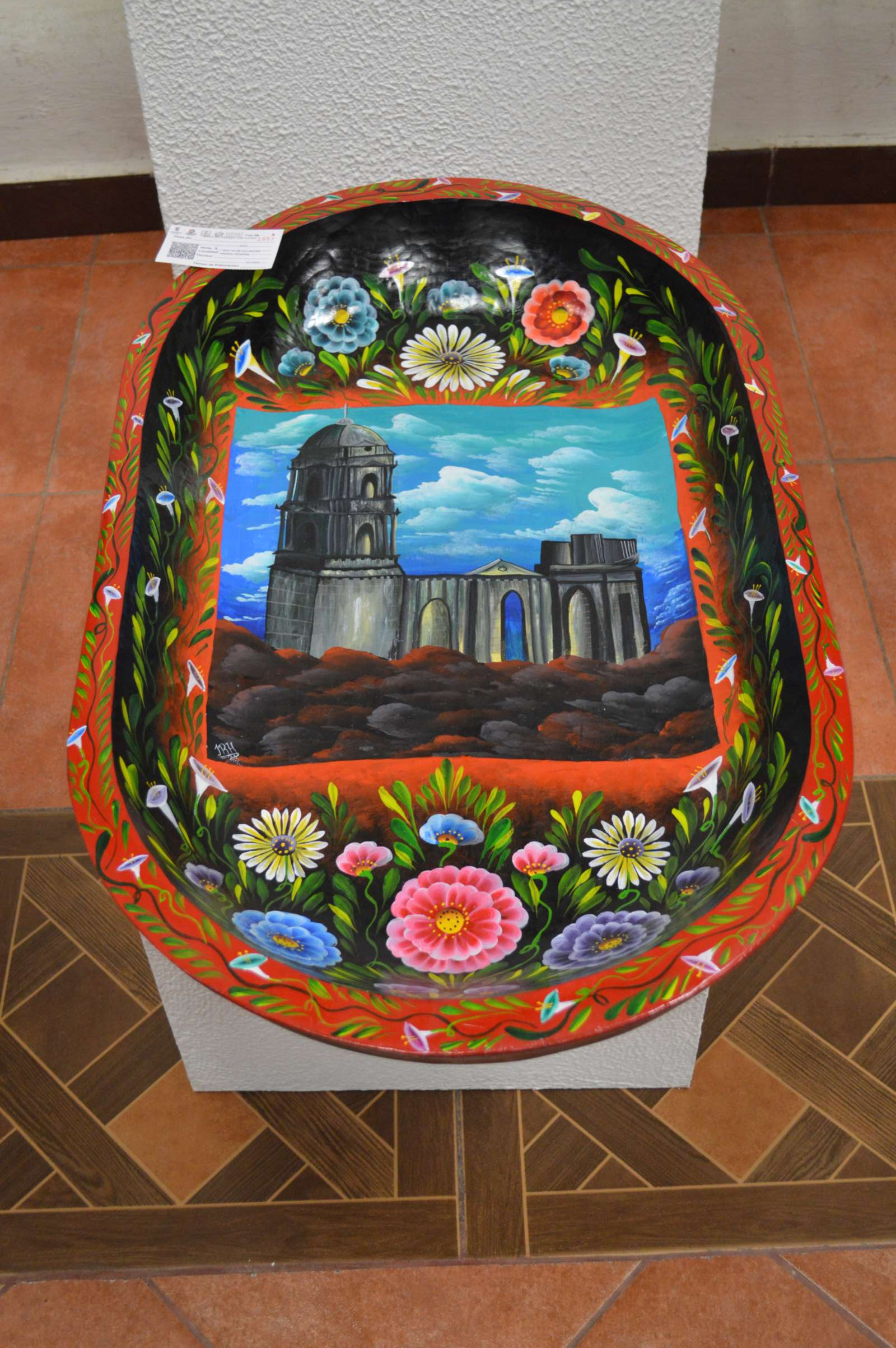
Maque plate competing at the annual state handcrafts competition, with image of the Paricutin church

There are two kinds of lacquer, laca, using more modern chemicals and maque, a pre Hispanic method using a wax derived from the female insect coccus axin found in the Tierra Caliente, as well as chia, chicalote or more recently linseed oils. These are mixed with dolomite limestone or lime-enriched plaster, locally called teputzchuta. Colorings are usually mineral in origin but sometimes from animal and vegetable sources as well.

Lacquering mostly developed in the state during the colonial period in Uruapan, Patzcuaro and Quiroga. Over time, variations in technique and style emerged in places such as Uruapan, Patzcuaro and Quiroga. Patzcuaro developed a new style of outlining images in gold and Quiroga specialized in brush-painted trays.

The gold-painted lacquer pieces begin by cleaning the surface with a mixture of gasoline and manganese and repairing any chips in the wood. A base is applied and then layers of lacquer are applied until the surface is smooth and shiny. The most common base colors are black, dark brown and purple, green and orange. The last step is to add tiny pieces of gold leaf with cotton swabs soaked in oil to highlight portion of the design. Colors are then applied to the body of the design, contrasting with the darker base.

== Other crafts ==
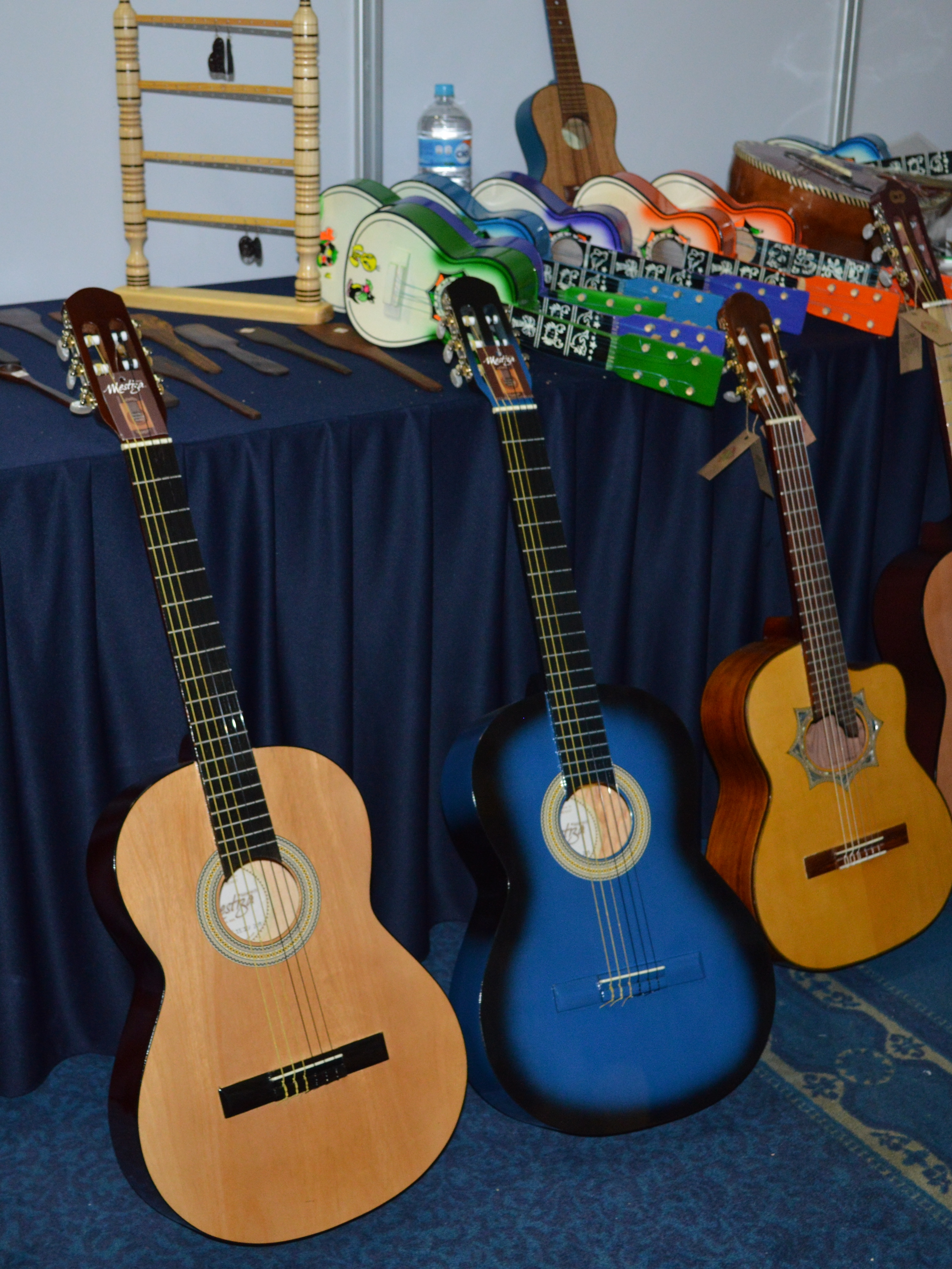
Guitars from Paracho

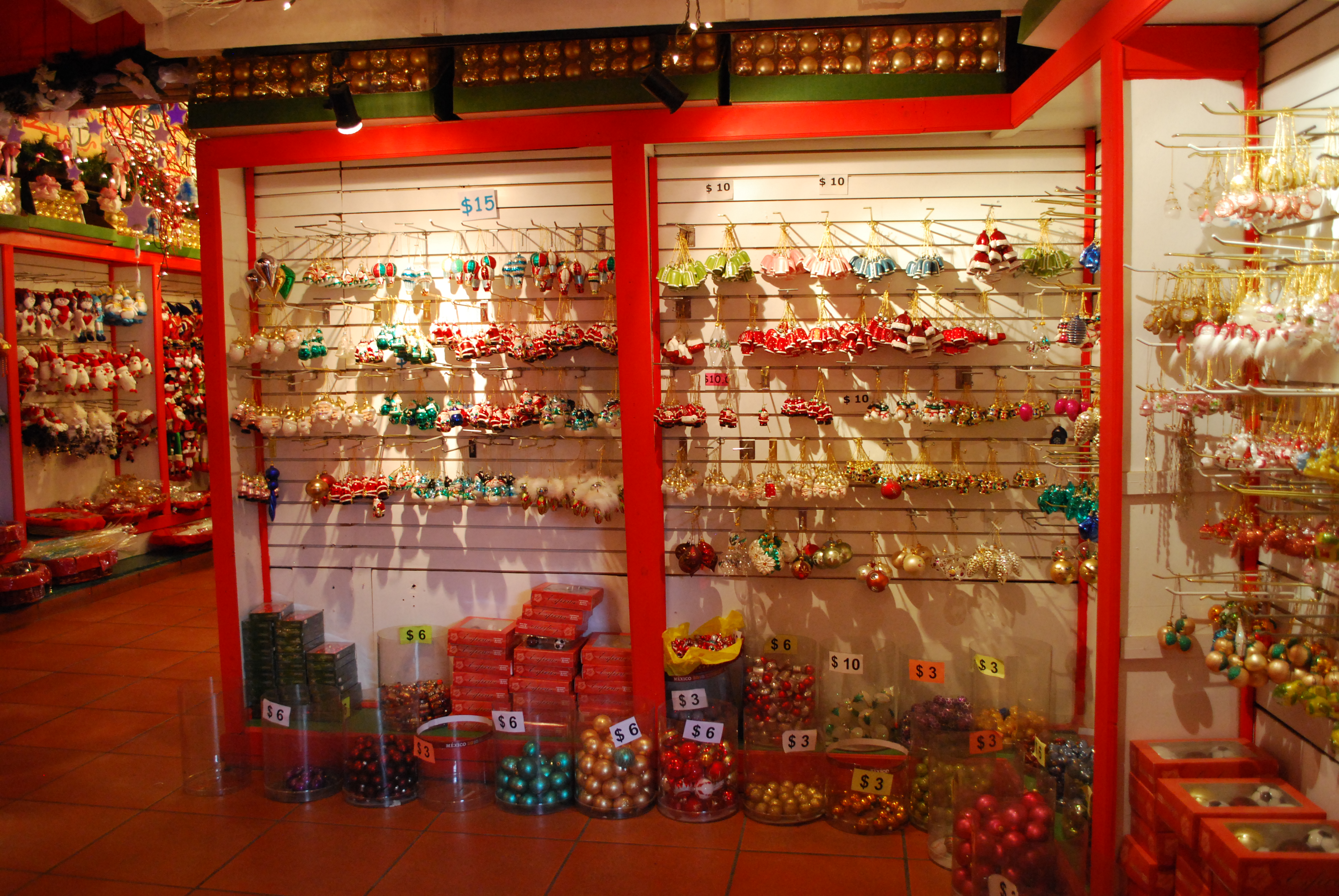
Christmas ornaments in Tlalpujahua

Other crafts include leatherwork, wax items and papel picado. Major leather goods include huaraches (the most common item), saddles, embroidered belts, leather backed chairs, and cueras (a kind of long deerskin coat). The Tierra Caliente region of the state is known for the making of a unique kind of leather-backed chair/bench. The leather rests on a frame made of strips of bark combed with hardwood twigs and branches. The frame is made from stronger woods. Wax sculpting is generally found in candle making and sculptures.

Feather work is still done in Tlalpujahua and Morelia. This art has its origins and reached its peak during the late pre Hispanic period and into the very early colonial period, with feathers used to decorate shields, standards, headdresses, mosaic images, caps and more for the ruling classes. There are efforts to revive it. Tlalpujahua has workshops that create feather images of religious icons, landscapes, animals and more using feathers of different colors and sizes, mostly sold in Tlalpujahua and in Morelia. Local artisans Gabriel Olay Olay and Luis Guillermos Olay Barrientos have won national awards for their work. Gabriel Olay's work has been gifted by Mexican presidents to various dignitaries in the world.

Cantera (tuff) is a volcanic stone particular to central Mexico and is a common material both for building and sculpting. Pink colored cantera can be seen all over the historic center of Morelia, with about 1,400 buildings being completely or partially built with it. Morelia remains a center for the working of this stone with raw materials and finished products sent to other parts of Mexico and abroad. Other towns known for this work are Tlalpujahua and Tzintzuntzan. The stone here comes in various colors such as gray, black, yellow and brown along with pink. Sculpted pieces include religious images and fountains, mostly made to order.

The towns of Angahuan and Zirahuén are noted for small rag figures that portray scenes of daily life. Paracho, Aranza and Chrán make tops, yo-yo and cup-and-ball toys with small wood trucks made in Quiroga.

Tlalpujahua's best-known craft is the making of glass spheres for Christmas trees, most of which are hand painted. These ornaments are sold in Mexico and exported abroad in the Americas as well as to Europe and Japan.

== Notable artisans ==
- Punzo family (copper crafts)
- Elena Felipe and Bernadina Rivera
- Emilio Molinero Hurtado
- Hilario Alejos Madrigal
- María de Jesús Nolasco Elías
- Pedro Ruiz Martínez and Odilia Pineda
- Neftalí Ayungua Suárez
- Mario Agustín Gaspar
