= Palm Sunday Handcraft Market =

Handcrafts market in Uruapan, Michoacán, Mexico

Coordinates: 19°25′15.56″N 102°3′47.11″W

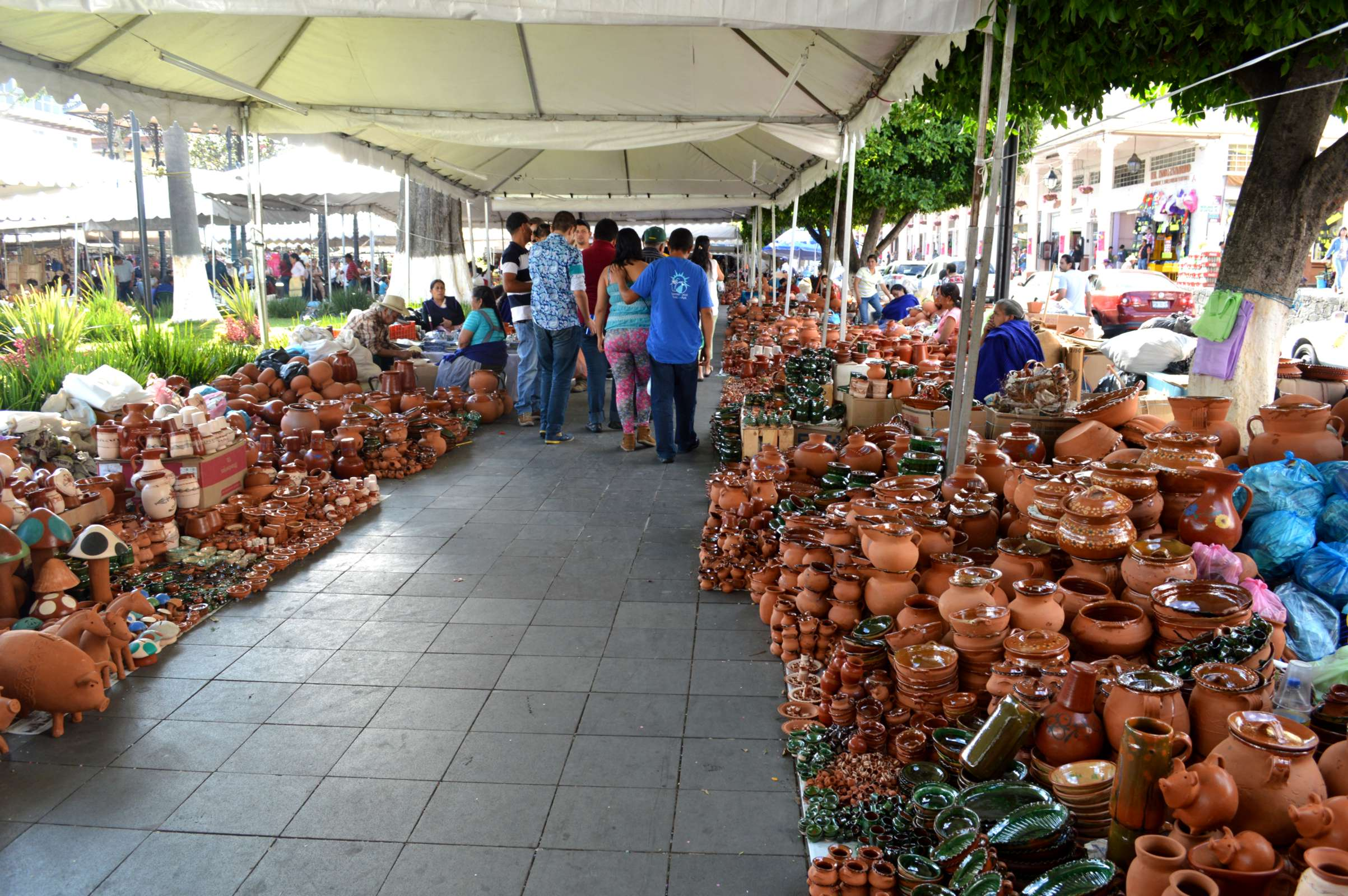
Small section with pottery on the main square of Uruapan

The Palm Sunday Handcraft Market (Spanish: Tianguis de Domingo de Ramos), held in Uruapan, is the largest event in the Mexican state of Michoacán dedicated to the sale of the state’s traditional handcrafts and is reputed to be the largest of its kind in Latin America. The event draws over 1,300 artisans who offer over a million pieces for sale, which represent all of the state’s major handcraft traditions. It also includes other events such as a handcraft competition, exhibition of indigenous dress, food and other traditions, concerts, dance and more. The event is centered on the very large main plaza of the city of Uruapan, but extends over to adjoining streets and to other plazas in the city.

== The tianguis ==
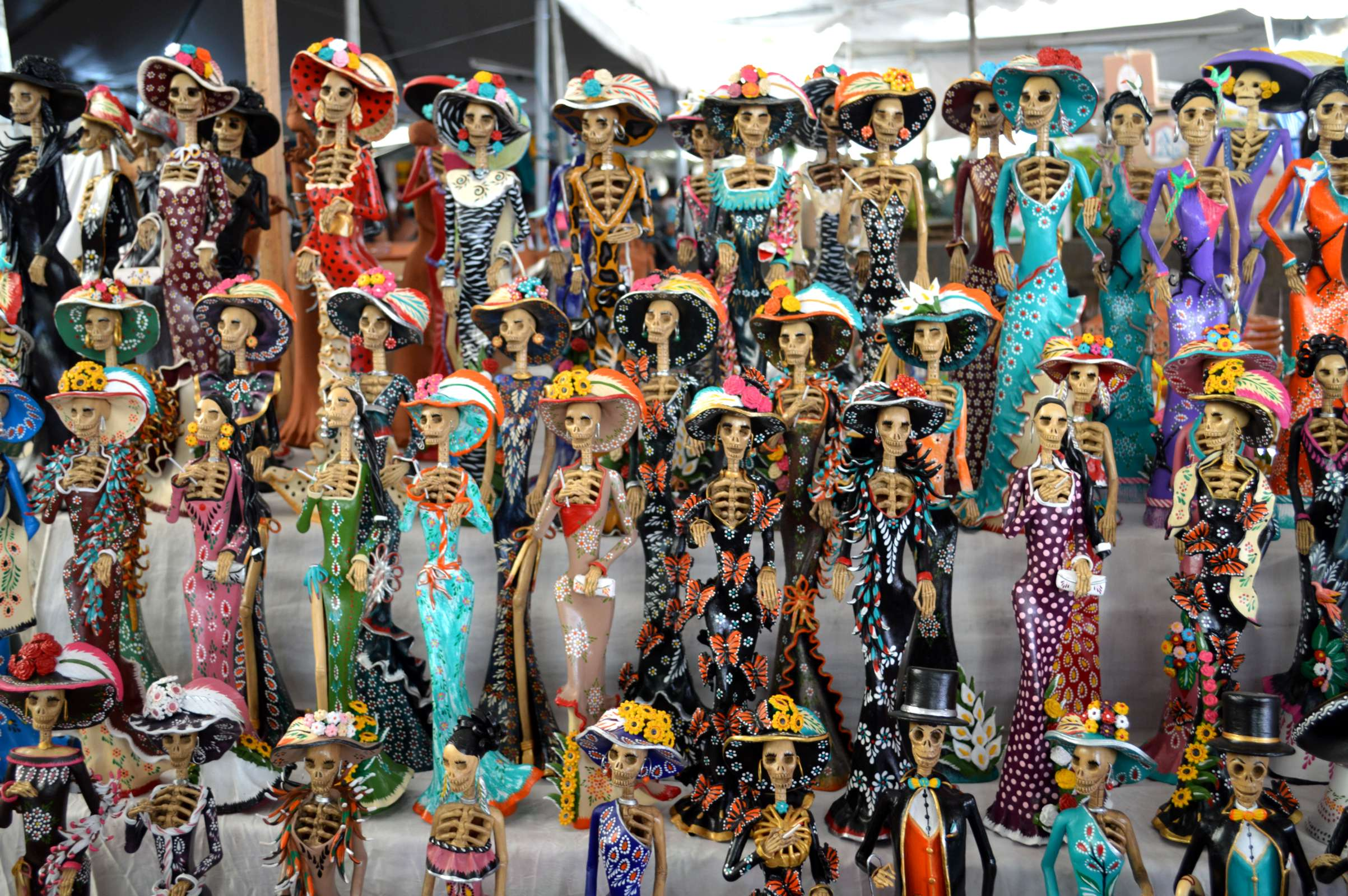
La Calavera Catrina figures from Capula at the market

The tianguis (open air market) runs during Holy Week, officially beginning on the day before Palm Sunday and runs until the day after Easter Sunday, with the most important day being Palm Sunday (Domingo de Ramos). This is a major vacation period in Mexico, and the event draws visitors from Mexico and abroad.

It is the largest handcrafts event in Michoacán, followed closely by the Día de Muertos Fair in Pátzcuaro, and it is claimed to be the largest of its kind in Latin America. In 2015, the event drew over 1,300 artisans from all over the state, especially the Purépecha highland region, from towns such as Tzintzuntzan, San José de Gracia, Capula, Huáncito, Patamban, Santo Tomas, Cocucho and Paracho. It is the most important event for the four major indigenous communities of Michoacán (Mazahua, Nahua, Otomi and Purépecha). However, not all vendors are the artisans themselves, some are resellers.

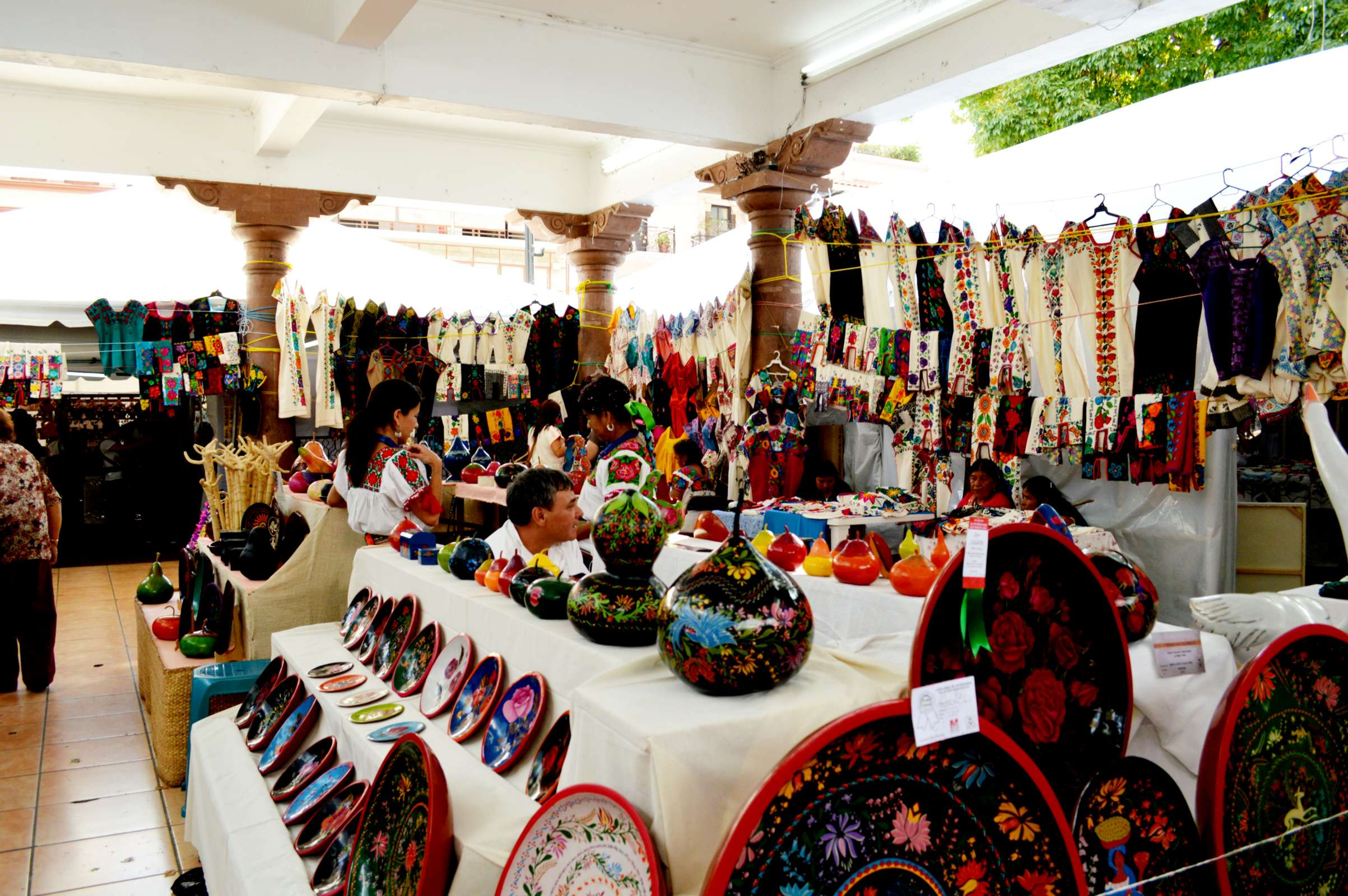
Section of the market selling maque and textiles

The tianguis fills the large main plaza (Plaza de Martíres de Uruapan) of the city and overflows to adjoining streets and other plazas such as Morelos Plaza, Huatapera Plaza and the Garcia Ortiz alleyway next to the Casa de Cultura (cultural center). Related events occurs in these areas as well as the Plaza de la Ranita, the Casa de Cultura, and the entrance to the Barranca de Cupatizio National Park.

In 2015, there were over one million pieces for sale, representing all of the major handcraft traditions. These include textiles and traditional clothing, miniatures, jewelry, toys, furniture, lacquered gourds, chests, leather goods, iron, other metals, and the various types of ceramics produced, and those from stiff fibers such as wicker and palm fronds. Most of the items for sale are of high quality and are of styles only found in Michoacan such as clay pots from Huancito with animal heads, needlework from Charan, pre Hispanic lacquerware (maque) from Uruapan, copper pieces from Santa Clara del Cobre and wooden masks from Pamatacuaro, but there are some stands selling mostly tourist and cheap items. For Palm Sunday, there are even more craftspeople, mostly Purépecha, on the atriums of the two main colonial churches, weaving palm fronds into intricate designs for churchgoers.

== Related events ==
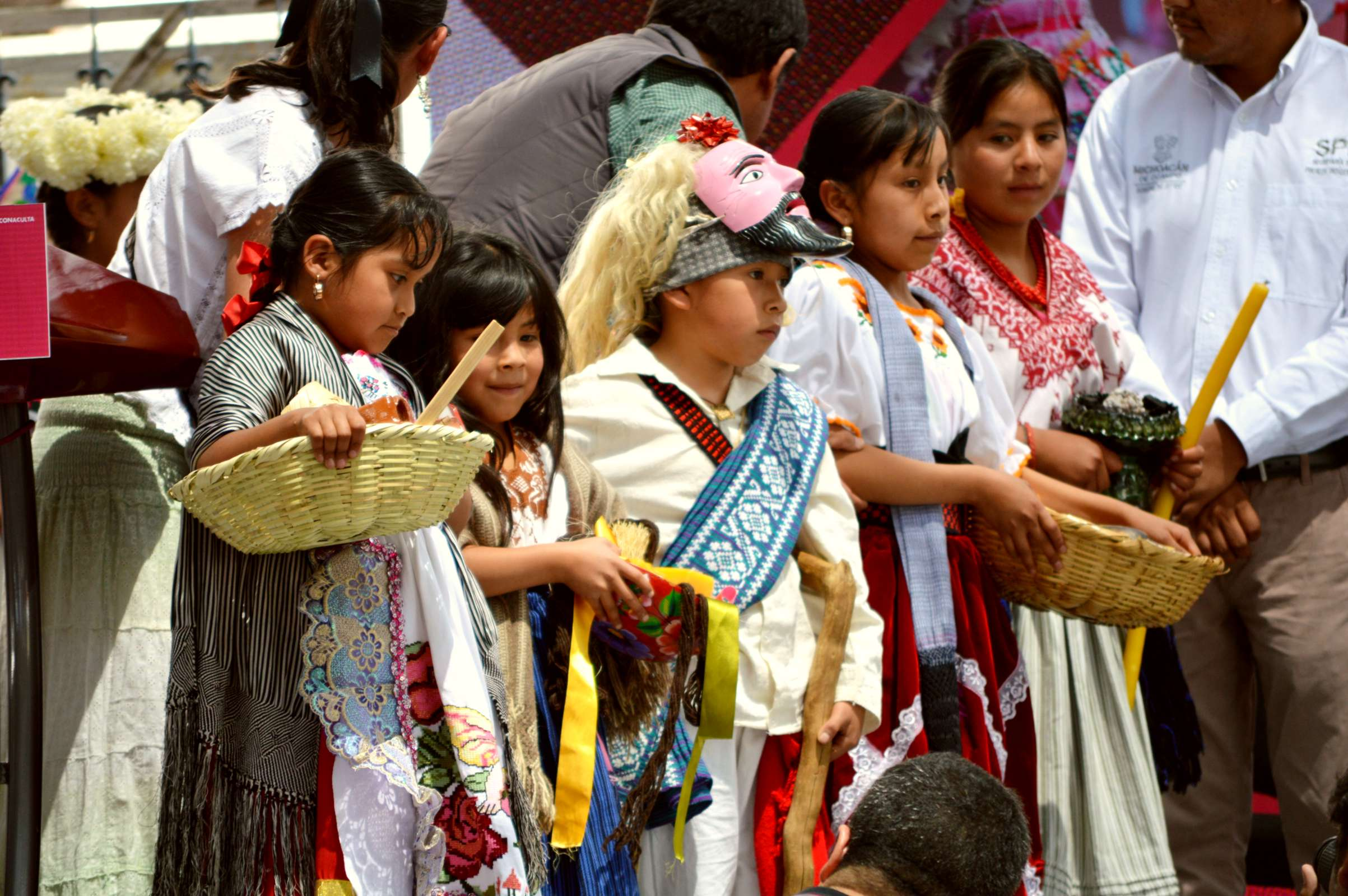
Purépecha children representing their community at the event in 2015

Over its history, the tianguis proper has since been expanded with other cultural events such as music and dance performances, a parade of artisans, a food exhibition featuring the traditional cuisine of the Purépecha and more.

The week is inaugurated with a parade of artisans and others in traditional dress, representing the four indigenous peoples found in the state, representing 45 communities and 25 Michoacan municipalities. The parade also include artisans with examples of their wares such as those from Santa Clara del Cobre, Pamatacuaro and Paracho along with marching bands and mojigangas (large cartonería puppet figures) . The parade runs from the National Park to the center of the city along Culver City and Emilio Carranza streets, ending at the Casa de Cultura.

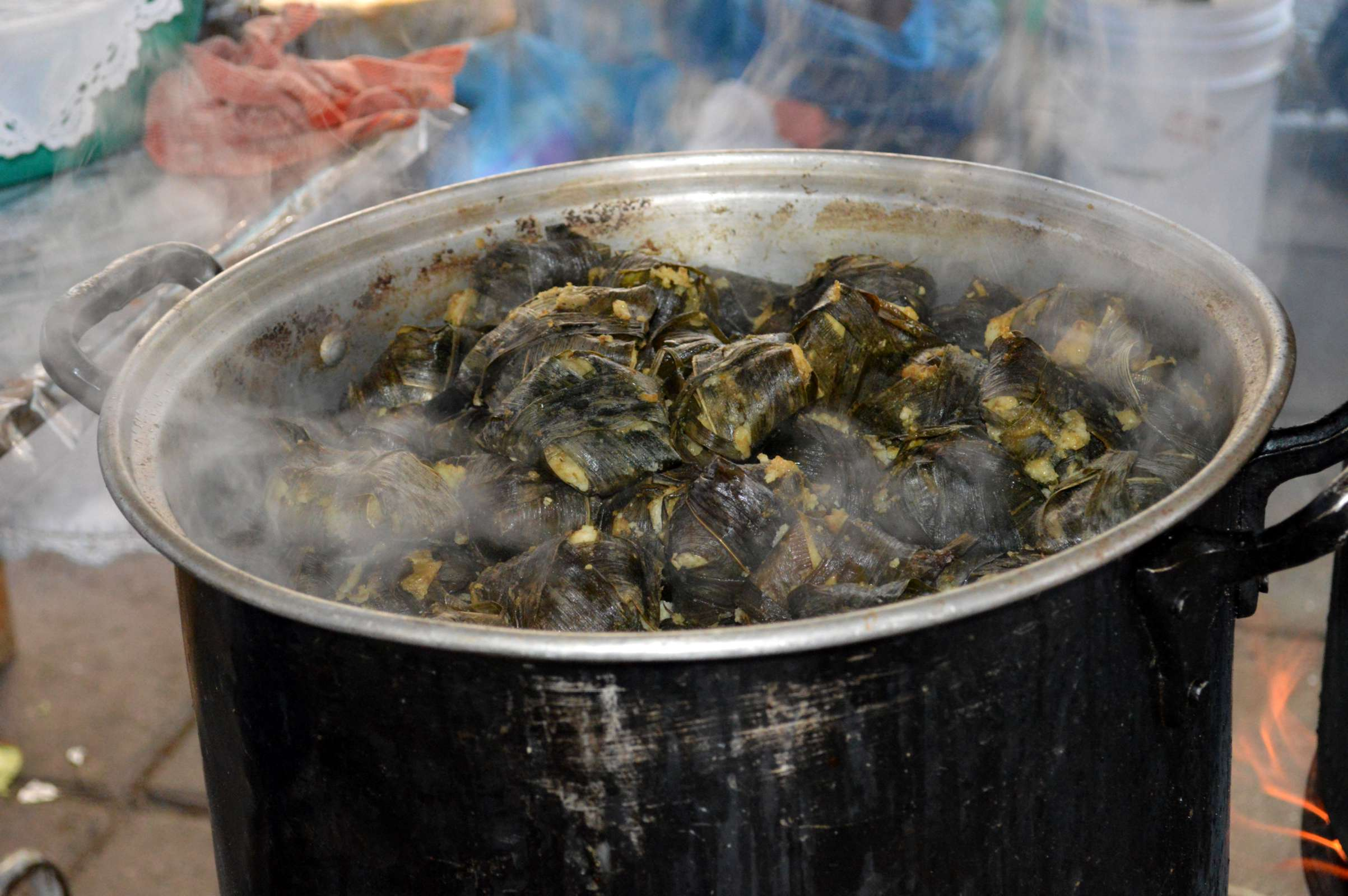
Corundas (similar to tamales) steaming in a huge vat at the Plaza de la Ranita

The Casa de Cultura host’s the state’s main handcraft competition, where winners are announced on Palm Sunday. In 2015, the competition awarded over a million pesos in prizes in 259 awards. On the same day there is the State Regional Costume Festival held at the Huatapera Museum, in which all four indigenous communities are represented, both in dress and traditions such as dance.

At the Plaza de la Ranita, there is a demonstration and sale of traditional Purépecha food, which includes pozole, corundas, atole, enchiladas, buñuelos, uchepos (tamales of sweet corn) and fish dishes. The goal of this is to provide example of more traditional and less tourist foods. Atole includes the atolenuitede from San Miguel Pomocuaran, which is salty and spice with serrano chili peppers. Churipo is a beef soup, atole de pinole (with toasted corn), tamales de chapata, made with amaranth seed.

== History ==
The event is located in Uruapan, which has been an important commercial center since the pre Hispanic period because it is centered among the major Purépecha regions (Lake, Purepech highlands, Cañada de los Once Pueblos and Ciènega de Chapala), as well as between the highlands and the “Tierra Caliente,” the lower elevations that extend to the coast.

The area has been an important one for trade since the pre Hispanic period as it is centered among the major Purépecha regions (Lake, Purepech highlands, Cañada de los Once Pueblos and Ciènega de Chapala). The original tianguis was dedicated only to pottery. which lasted for two or three days on Melchor Ocampo Street onto Santiago Street and the Izazaga Plaza. Later, this area was remodeled to create the current Morelos Plaza. This posed a problem for the vendors until the current event was established in 1960.
