= Neftalí Ayungua Suárez =

Mexican potter (1936–2021)

Neftalí Ayungua Suárez (April 27, 1936 – June 2021) was a Mexican potter from Patamban, Michoacán, named a "grand master" of Mexican folk art.

== Life and career ==
Ayungua Suárez was born in Támbani Anápu, Michoacán but moved to Patamban, an indigenous community at the base of a small mountain of the same name in the Tangancícuaro Mountains, where Purépecha is still spoken. The town is noted for its green glazed ceramics, especially platters, plates, jars, pineapple shaped storage containers and many other items.

He attended school only until the second year of primary as he had to work the family’s corn and vegetable fields. Only much later did he learn to read, forced by the need to read road signs in his later travels to sell his wares. At age 21, he married Ana María Cuevas, who taught him how to make ceramics. The artisan at one point tried to migrate to the United States but could not pass the border, so worked in Tonalá, Jalisco for a few months. There he learned about firing methods and how to keep pieces from sticking together. When he returned to Patamban, he not only used the techniques himself but also taught family and neighbors. Ayungua Suárez and his wife have been making pottery full time since 1974. Today, he is the best-known artisan in Patamban, commonly known as Tatá (grandfather) Talí.

Ayungua Suárez's works range from tiny miniatures to large cooking vessels and have a combination of dark and light green coloring along with white and rust. They are decorated with black, red and white. Working on a heavy wood table, he works clay from local sources, which has been cleaned and pulverized by hand. He uses molds he has made himself of plaster or fired clay with certain elements such as texturizing the pineapple pieces done by hand. The pieces are covered in a slip and fired the first time. After cooling the pieces are glazed and fired again, which is more delicate process and more pieces are lost.

He worked to get government cooperation for local artisans as head of the Tata Talí artisans’ group.

In 2001, his work was recognized by being named a “grand master” by the Fomento Cultural Banamex . In 2008, the Universidad Autónoma de Colima honored him with an exhibition and award ceremony.

Ayungua Suárez died in June 2021, at the age of 85.
