= Arturo Moyers Villena =

Mexican painter

Arturo Moyers Villena (January 2, 1930 – February 3, 2013) was a Mexican muralist and painter, whose work was influenced by David Alfaro Siqueiros. Many of his mural works are exhibited in government buildings or cultural institutions.

== Life ==
Arturo Moyers was born in Los Mochis, Sinaloa, on January 2, 1938. At age 16, he entered the Academy of San Carlos in Mexico City. Moyers went back to his native town in 1957 to work with Master Erasto Cortés Juárez at the Fine Arts Workshop of the Autonomous University of Sinaloa. There he principally did stage sets for the University Theater Group of Sinaloa. He managed the workshop until 1969, when political repression forced him to leave Sinaloa due to his left-wing ideology. He moved back to Mexico City, and in that same year, Mario Orozco Rivera introduced him to David Alfaro Siqueiros. Moyers worked with Alfaro Siqueiros on the project of the Polyforum Cultural Siqueiros, and even though he was part of this project only on its final stage, he would be highly influenced by the artist during the rest of his life. Moyers remained under Siqueiros's guidance at La Tallera, (also known as Siquerios's workshop), until he died on 1974.

In 1985 Moyers settled in the State of Hidalgo, and governor Guillermo Rossell de la Lama invited him to paint the walls of the Government Palace of Hidalgo. In 1997, he painted his first mural outside of Mexican territory, in Cleveland, Texas. The following year he had another international experience by working for the Eternal Heritage Museum, in Puttaparthi, India. He was also part of the Celebration of Mexican political anniversaries in 2010, by painting a mural on the Government Palace in Culiacán. Arturo Moyers also received the Artistic Award of Sinaloa in 2010. Moyers Villena died at age 75, leaving behind his wife Antonieta López. Local media in Hidalgo reported the ''Loss of an adoptive son''.

== Artistry ==
Moyers Villena was a student and apprentice to David Alfaro Siqueiros, and his artistic work shows a strong influence from him. He focused on muralism, but also did numerous paintings. Most of the topics on his art were the social concerns from the first half of the 20th century. He stated his desire to make art of the people and for the people, highlighting the need for social transformation through revolutionary actions.
