= Charlie Goff =

American educator (born 1951)

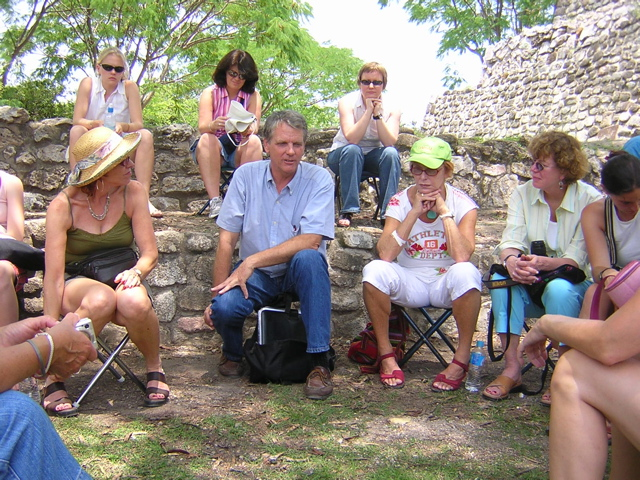
Charlie Goff (center) leading a field study at Xochicalco, Morelos, Mexico.

Charles Pollard Goff (born November 9, 1951, in Barranquilla, Colombia) is an American educator and founding member of Cemanahuac Educational Community, a Spanish and Latin American culture school in Cuernavaca, Morelos, Mexico.

== Early life ==
Goff was born in Barranquilla, Colombia, to James E. and Margaret Louise Pollard Goff. He spent his childhood and teenage years in Colombia, graduating from Colegio Nueva Granada in Bogotá in 1969. He then attended college, taking undergraduate courses at UC Santa Cruz, the National Autonomous University of Mexico (UNAM), the Ibero-American University of Mexico City, and the State University of New York. He graduated from Cal State-Northridge with a Bachelor of Arts in anthropology, specializing in Mayan culture.

== Cemanahuac ==
Goff is a founding member of Cemanahuac Educational Community, a highly respected Spanish-language school in Cuernavaca, Mexico. Founded in 1974, Cemanahuac offers courses in Spanish language, Latin-American studies and Mesoamerican anthropology. Currently, over 2400 students from all over the world study at Cemanahuac every year, with over ninety colleges and universities from the United States accepting direct credit transfer from the school.

Goff currently serves as admissions coordinator for the school, as well as handling the school's finances, hiring and public relations. He also teaches several courses, is an active lecturer at the school, and oversees and conducts field studies.

== Other activities ==
In addition to coordinating field trips for Cemanahuac, Goff has used his extensive knowledge of Mexico and Central America to assist many other organizations with field studies, including Ohio State University, Elderhostel, the National Association of Editorial Writers, and the Land Improvement Contractors Association of America, along with several high schools. He has also served as keynote speaker for several bilingual education and social studies seminars, and is active in many professional organizations in these areas. He serves on the board of directors for VAMOS, a charitable organization dedicated to helping the poor in the Mexican state of Morelos.

Goff is a member of Cuernavaca's Frente Civico, an organization founded to protect the environment, art, and archeological site known as Casino de la Selva. As a result of his activist activities, Goff was arrested in 2002. All charges were subsequently dropped. He also serves on the board of the human rights foundation named for the famous former Bishop of Morelos, Don Sergio Méndez Arceo.

In April 2010 Goff questioned the authenticity of an AP story about rampant "fear" in Cuernavaca. The story, viewed by Goff as fear-mongering, was picked up by papers around the world and has impacted Cuernavaca's tourism-based economy. Goff challenged the paper by re-interviewing those Cuernavaca citizens the AP quoted in their article and confronting AP's Latin American Bureau Chief, Niko Price, with the distortions in the article. In June 2010 a Mexico City English-language newspaper wrote about Goff's confrontation with AP. https://web.archive.org/web/20100616005804/http://thenews.com.mx/articulo/ap-shows-its-stripes-1063

As of October 2010, Goff has a regular column, "Charlie's Digs," appearing in The News, Mexico's only English-speaking newspaper. Goff's column can be found at https://web.archive.org/web/20100207173723/http://thenews.com.mx/

Some of Goff's MesoAmerican stories can be seen on Kentucky's Channel 2. https://player.vimeo.com/video/10561811

In recent years Goff has been a mitigation expert on death penalty cases in both California and Alabama.
