= Ignacio Ortiz =

Mexican painter (1934–2017)

Ignacio Ortiz Cedeño
- Born: 1934; La Piedad, Michoacán, Mexico
- Died: 2017 (aged 82–83); Mexico City, Mexico
- Education: Universidad Autónoma de Nuevo León; La Esmeralda; Academy of Fine Arts, Prague (MA); Uppsala University (PhD)
- Notable work: Musas y mujeres; Las Divas
- Spouse: Michelle Sandiel
- Awards: See Career: awards and recognitions

Ignacio Ortiz Cedeño (1934–2017), also known as Nacho Ortiz, was a Mexican painter, draughtsman, and jewelry designer born in La Piedad, Michoacán, known for his depictions of women.

== Life ==
Ignacio Ortiz was born in La Piedad, Michoacán in 1934. He moved with his family to Monterrey at the age of twelve, where he began to take an interest in painting. As a teenager, a neighbor noticed his small paintings and asked Ortiz's father to let him attend classes at a local school, where he studied with the Spanish painter Carmen Cortés and her husband. At eighteen, he entered the fine arts program at the Universidad Autónoma de Nuevo León, where he studied with José Guadalupe Ramírez, Jorge Rangel, and Spanish painter Juan Eugenio Mingorance. He was one of the first students at the university's new art program.

On the recommendation of Diego Rivera, David Alfaro Siqueiros, and Pablo O'Higgins, he obtained a scholarship to study at the Escuela Nacional de Pintura, Escultura y Grabado "La Esmeralda" in Mexico City. The three painters also helped him and other students start a small newspaper at the school. In 1957 he finished his studies in Mexico City and returned to Monterrey, where he became a painting instructor at the Universidad Autónoma de Nuevo León.

In 1958 he received another scholarship to study for a master's degree at the Academy of Fine Arts in Prague, Czechoslovakia, where he studied from 1958 to 1960. He exhibited at the Umprum Gallery in Prague and the Le France Gallery in Paris, as well as in Bratislava and Sofia. In 1962 he returned to Mexico.

In 1968 he returned to Europe on a scholarship for a doctorate in art history at Uppsala University in Sweden. He was named an honorary member of the Royal Union of Swedish Painters, and his work was shown at the Liljevalch Gallery in Uppsala and the Konsthall Gallery in Stockholm. While in Europe he met Pablo Picasso at an exhibition in Paris, and in 1971 Picasso invited him to work at his ceramics workshop in Vallauris, France. Shortly afterward, Ortiz returned to Mexico.

After his return, Ortiz lived and worked in Mexico City, in the Vizcaya building on Bucareli Street. There he befriended the poet Pita Amor, who dedicated some of her poems to his work. His friends also included María Félix, Irma Serrano, and Lola Beltrán. He remarked that any day he did not paint felt like dying a little. He was fluent in five languages.

Ortiz died in Mexico City in 2017. He was survived by his widow and representative, Michelle Sandiel.

His work appeared in several magazines and books, including Diálogo entre poesía y pintura (Dialogue between Poetry and Painting), published by Paralelo 21 in 2019 and edited by Sandiel. The book pairs the works of his series Musas y mujeres (Muses and Women) with poems by Pita Amor, who had offered to write a poem for each work upon learning of the series.

== Career ==
Ignacio Ortiz exhibited his work individually and collectively in Mexico, the United States, Sweden, France, Czechoslovakia, Bulgaria, Germany, Austria, Belgium, and Spain. His first exhibition was at the main hall of the Colegio Civil while he was a student, displayed alongside those of Gerardo Cantú and Marcos Cuellar. He also exhibited at the Donceles 66 Cultural Center, the Historical Center, the Industrial Club, and the Casa de la Cultura Tlalpan in Mexico City, and in the collective Pinacoteca NL Collection.

His individual exhibitions included:

- Umprum Gallery, Prague (1959)
- Galería El Caracol, Mexico City (1964)
- Galería Forma, Monterrey (1965)
- Upplans Gallery, Uppsala (1969)
- Konsthall, Stockholm (1970, retrospective)
- Palacio de Gobierno, Monterrey (1971)
- Galería Gandhi, Mexico City (1973)
- Palacio de Bellas Artes, Mexico City (1976)
- Casa de Cultura, Oaxaca (1976)
- Oficina de Gobierno, Nuevo León (1979)
- Palacio Municipal, Monterrey (1980)
- Casa de Cultura, Monterrey (1983)
- Galería Soutine (1990)
- Galería Arte AC (1994, retrospective)
- Salón de la Plástica Mexicana (1999, 2003)
- Museo de Monterrey (2000)
- Salón Niza, Mexico City (2004, 2005, 2008)
- Museo Metropolitano de Monterrey (2005)
- Pinacoteca de Nuevo León (2009, Las mujeres)
- Exhibition hall, Mexico City International Airport (2011)

He also exhibited individually at the Mary Moore Gallery in La Jolla, California, and privately for a group of collectors from the Televisa company.

His collective exhibitions included:

- Bratislava (1960)
- Mary Moore Gallery, La Jolla, California (1974)
- Galería Artes y Libros, Monterrey, and Museo de Arte Contemporáneo, Morelia (1976)
- Various venues in Sweden (1987)
- Galería Soutine, Mexico City (1988)
- Galería Enrique Jiménez (1992)
- Galería Gilberto Mata (1993)
- Palacio de Bellas Artes, Mexico City (1994)
- Cruz Roja, Monterrey (1995)
- Museo de Monterrey (1997)
- Salón de la Plástica Mexicana (1997, 1998, 2003)
- Centro Financiero Bancomer, Mexico City (2000)
- Museo Metropolitano de Monterrey (2005)
- Festival Internacional Cervantino (2007)
- Secretaría de Gobernación (2009)

Ortiz also worked as an educator. After finishing his studies in Mexico City in 1957, he returned to Monterrey as a painting instructor at the Universidad Autónoma de Nuevo León. In 1962 the university's fine arts school was reorganized as the Taller de Artes Plásticas, and Ortiz, who had recently returned from Czechoslovakia, was designated its first coordinator. He also directed the El Caracol Art Center. In 1966 he reorganized the fine arts workshop at the Universidad Veracruzana in Xalapa as its director, and in 1977 he began teaching at La Esmeralda.

He received various awards and recognitions, including first place at the Salón de Noviembre de Arte in 1962, a "Miró" drawing award in Barcelona, honorary membership in the Royal Union of Swedish Painters starting in 1969, recognition from the government of Nuevo León, recognition from the Secretariat of Education and Culture for his contributions to Nuevo León art, and a diploma from the Universidad Autónoma de Nuevo León. He was a member of the Salón de la Plástica Mexicana. In 2005 the Museo Metropolitano of Monterrey honored him with an award for his life's work and cultural contributions.

== Artistry ==
As an artist emerging in post-Muralist Mexico, Ortiz was a contemporary and friend of Francisco Corzas, Óscar Rodríguez, Pedro Friedeberg, Francisco Icaza, Arnold Belkin, Jorge Alsaga, Roberto Donis, Mario Orozco Rivera, and Rodolfo Nieto, as well as Oscar Rodríguez Naranjo, Juan Manuel de la Rosa, and José Luis Serrano, most of whom trained in Mexican universities.

Much of his output focused on women, with entire series dedicated to them, such as Las Divas (The Divas) and Musas y mujeres (Muses and Women). In 2020, the magazine Siempre! described the subjects of the latter series, selected by Ortiz, as "free, heterodox, transgressive" women, attributing the choice to his closeness to Pita Amor. The series included portraits of La Bella Otero, María la Egipcíaca, and María Magdalena, alongside a self-portrait and heads resembling a tzompantli. He believed that women were central to art, literature, and music, and often named the women in his family, his friends, and his wife as his primary muses. A 2009 article in the university newspaper La Flama described his paintings of women, with their geometric backgrounds and figures flooded with color, as making "a clear allusion to the cubism of Picasso".
