= Manuel Suárez y Suárez =

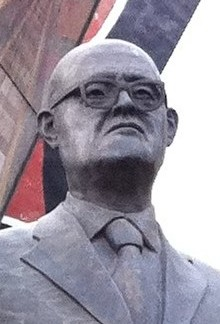
- Detail of a sculpture of David Alfaro Siqueiros and Suárez outside the Poliforum Siqueiros, Mexico City
- Born: 23 March 1896; Navia, Asturias, Spain
- Died: 23 July 1987 (aged 91); Mexico City, Mexico
- Occupation: Entrepreneur
- Known for: Casino de la Selva, Polyforum Cultural Siqueiros

Manuel Suárez y Suárez (23 March 1896 – 23 July 1987) was a Spanish immigrant to Mexico who became a successful entrepreneur and patron of the arts. He is known for the Casino de la Selva in Cuernavaca, the Hotel de México, and the adjacent Polyforum Cultural Siqueiros.

== Early years (1896–1919) ==
Manuel Suárez y Suárez was born on 23 March 1896 in Téifaros, 3 kilometres (1.9 mi) from Navia, Asturias. He was the second son of a family of ten. His parents were cousins, Balbina Suárez Rodríguez of Téifaros and Manuel Suárez Fernández of Loredo, Villayón. They grew potatoes and grain, and had two cows and a donkey. He received a basic education in the village school, and acquired a love of books. Manuel's older brother Joaquin moved to Mexico to work on the dairy farm of his uncle Joaquín Rodríguez y García Loredo, but when he arrived found his uncle had died. Joaquin became a clerk at the wholesale grain merchant Casa Peral Alverde and saved up to fund Manuel's journey to Mexico.

In the spring of 1911 at the age of 15 Manuel emigrated to Mexico. He was hired by the Casa Peral Alvede to travel through the north and center of Mexico buying crops. In May 1914 he was captured by the insurgents under Pancho Villa. He was almost shot, but then was made a lieutenant colonel and served on Villa's general staff for almost a year before being given leave to return to Mexico City. The Suárez brothers prospered and were able to bring their three younger brothers to join them. From 1918 to 1919 Manuel studied at the School of Commerce in Gijón.

== Inter-war period (1919–1942) ==
In 1919 Manuel and Joachim Suárez left the Casa Peral Alverde and founded the La Mexicana grocery store in the La Merced neighborhood of Mexico City. In 1923 Manuel left this business and founded a building supply company named Eureka in partnership with the son of Plutarco Elías Calles, the future President of Mexico. He later became the sole owner of this business. He undertook contracts to build infrastructure for the states' improvemement boards (Juntas De Mejoras). Part of his fortune came from buying land at low cost in places such as Acapulco, Nogales, Veracruz, Manzanillo, Tijuana, Laredo and Ciudad Juarez that he later sold after these communities started to develop.

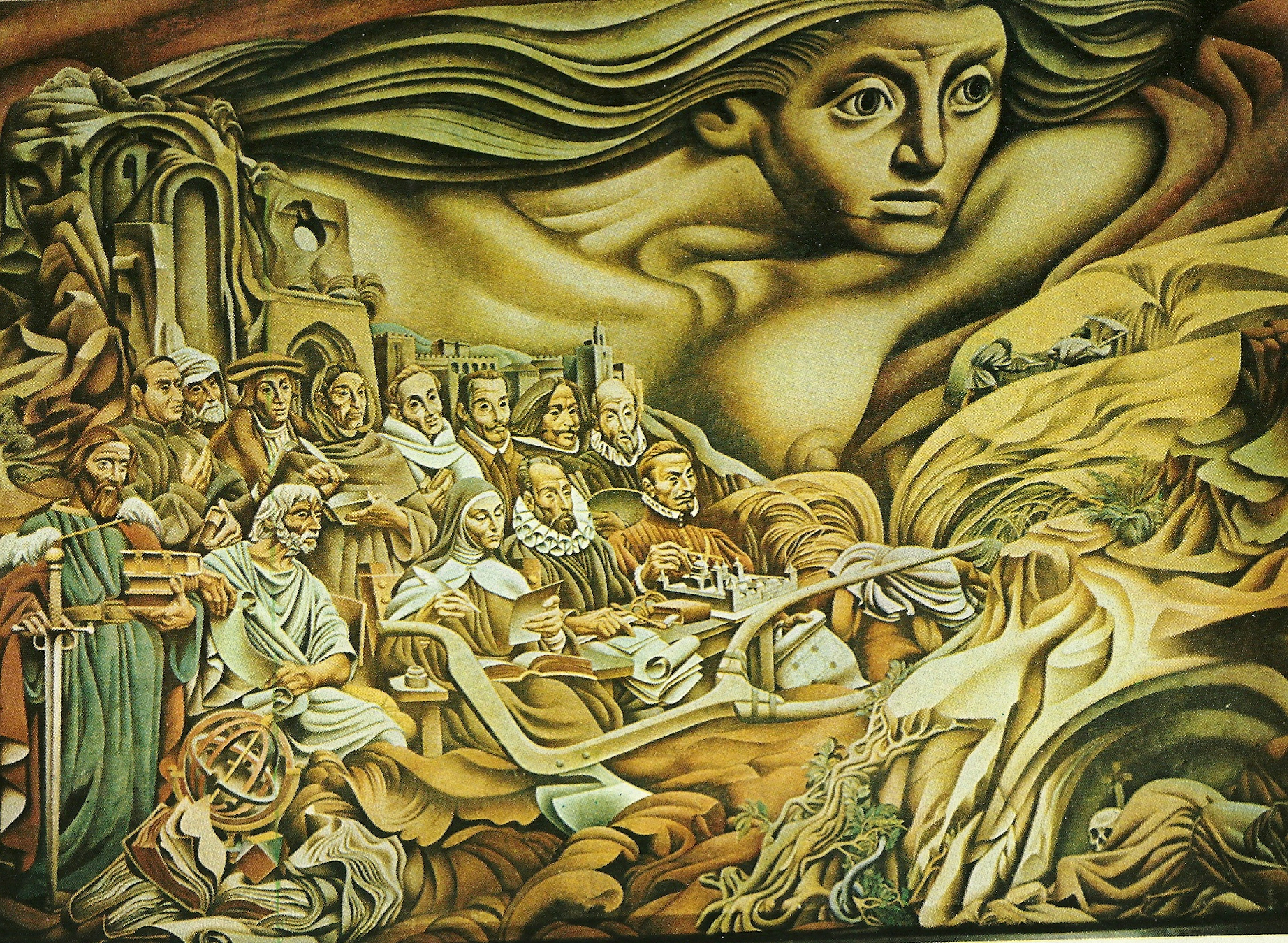
Fragment of the mural "La Hispanidad" by Josep Renau, salvaged from the Casino de la Selva

The first constitutional governor of Morelos state, Vicente Estrada Cajigal^{(es)}, authorized construction of a casino complex in Cuernavaca by the Compañía Hispanoamericana de Hoteles. This was a consortium of Mexican businessmen backed by President Abelardo L. Rodríguez. Suárez was the building contractor. The Casino de la Selva was inaugurated in 1931 near the train station. It was briefly the most luxurious watering spot in the Americas until the Garci-Crespo Hotel opened in Tehuacán in 1934. However, the owners were unable to pay their debts to the state or to the builders. Suárez was the main creditor and acquired the property in 1934. That year the new president Lázaro Cárdenas took office. One of his first decrees banned gambling in Mexico since he saw casinos as centers of vice. Suárez retained the property but ran it purely as a hotel.

Suárez and the Valencian architect Jesús Martí Martín founded the company Vías y Obras (Roads and Works), which built facilities in the ports of Veracruz, Acapulco and other cities. In 1936 Suárez bought the Hotel Mocambo in Veracruz. That year he went to Italy to buy machinery for Eureka. He had trouble with the authorities of the Mussolini regime, who seized a cross of diamonds and pearls he had bought for one of his daughters, and from then on was opposed to Italian Fascism. However, he supported General Francisco Franco with supplies during the Spanish Civil War. Between 1936 and 1941 he invested in sugar mills in Sonora, Oaxaca, Tepic and Sinaloa.

== Years of prosperity (1942–1966) ==
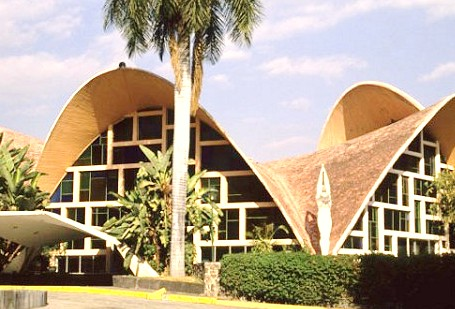
Dining room in front of the auditorium at Casino de la Selva

During World War II (1939–1945) Mexico declared war on the Axis in 1942. Suárez helped develop the system of replacing imports by local production. He said later that President Manuel Ávila Camacho (1940–1946) offered to make him Minister of the Economy three times, but he refused on the basis that business should be separate from politics. Suárez was also a close friend of President Miguel Alemán Valdés (1946–52), who promoted development of tourism. He loved art, and promoted the career of contemporary artists such as Dr. Atl (Gerardo Murillo), David Alfaro Siqueiros, Jorge González Camarena, José Reyes Meza, Francisco Icaza and Josep Renau.

Suárez wanted the Casino de la Selva to be a gathering place for intellectuals and artists, and commissioned various works of art for the walls and gardens. He hired Mexican and Spanish artists such as José Reyes Meza and Josep Renau to decorate the walls with murals showing Mexican history from the pre-Columbian period to the modern age. The murals would cover an area of 600 square metres (6,500 sq ft). The hotel became the center of cultural activity in Cuernavaca and was visited by artists, writers and political activists.

At the end of the 1950s the construction company of the brothers Félix, Antonio and Julia Candela built a dining room attached to an auditorium at the Casino de la Selva, and a non-denominational chapel in place of the fountain at the entrance, all with shell roofs. Félix Candela's pupil, the architect Juan Antonio Tonda^{(fr)}, designed the shells and about 30 bungalows in the south of the site and oversaw construction. Later the chapel was converted to a nightclub, the Club Jano, and then the Discoteca Mambo. The dining room, the Salón de los Relojes (Salon of the Clocks), had a roof formed of five paraboloid sections with a large clock hanging from the central point where the arcs intersected showing the times of places around the world. The auditorium, reached via the Salón de los Relojes, had a single hyperbolic paraboloid roof and contained the mural La farándula (Showbiz) by the Mexican artist Francisco Icaza, a tribute to the German playwright Bertolt Brecht.

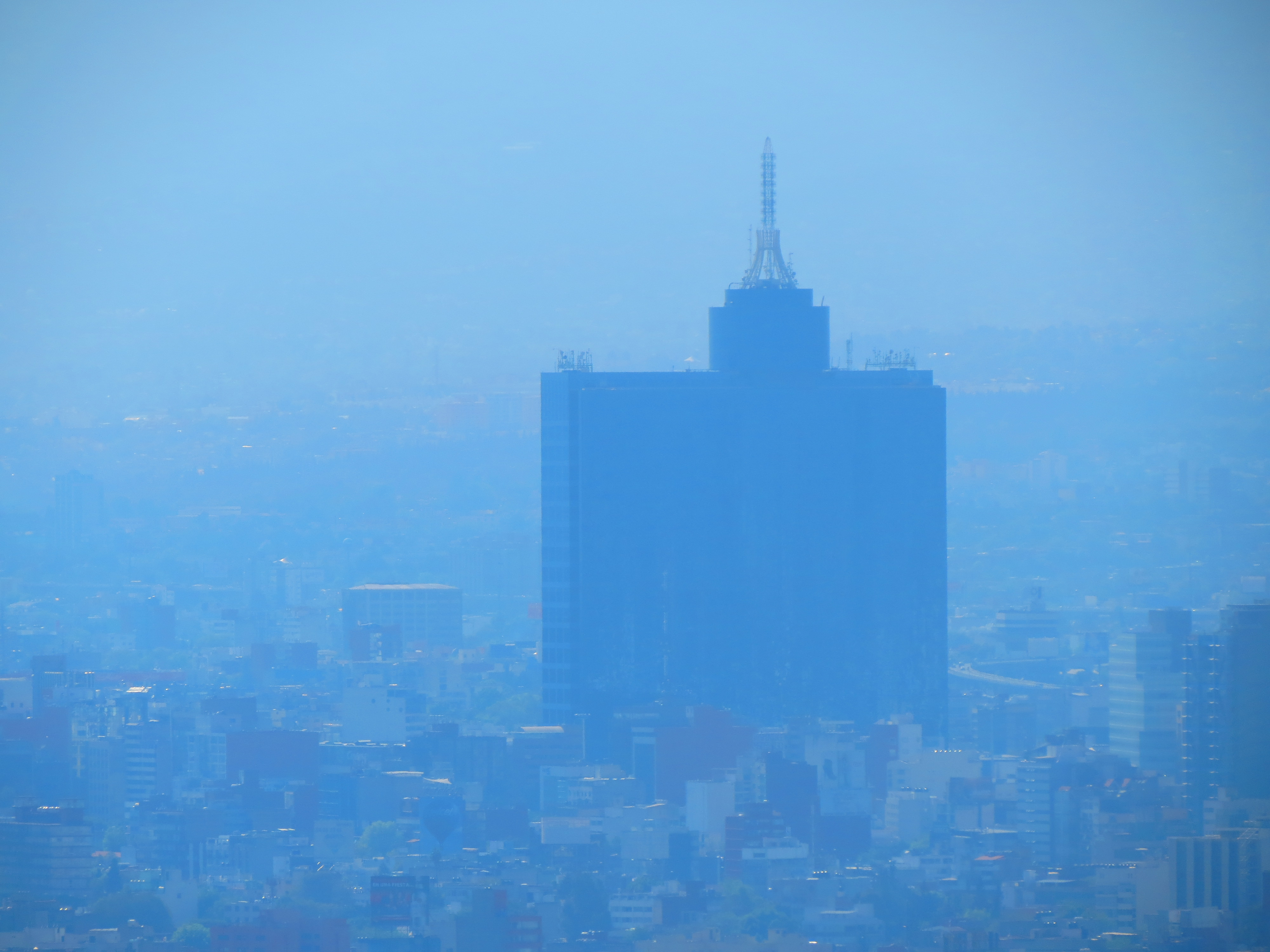
World Trade Center, Mexico

== Last years (1966–1987) ==
Suárez opened three restaurants in Mexico City, and in 1966 embarked on building the Gran Hotel de México (now the World Trade Center). Suarez conceived the idea of building a major business and tourist complex named Mexico 2000, centered around the huge Hotel de México. From the 1970s until his death he put most of his energy into the project, which grew out of control.

The hotel was to be the largest in the Americas, 237 metres (778 ft) high with 1,500 rooms. It was to be 51 stories high with 1,508 hexagonal rooms that could house 3,100 guests. A panoramic elevator would be able to carry 100 tourists, and 19 other elevators for normal passengers, and there would be one covered and one open air panoramic terrace. A heliport would be equipped with customs. There would be four cafeterias and six restaurants, with a revolving restaurant on the top floor, five reception halls, a 3000-person convention room, a 21,500 square feet (2,000 m^{2}) spiral-shaped shopping mall, a theatre, museum and so on. The building was unfinished when Suarez died, and remained an unfinished skeleton for many years.

The Polyforum Cultural Siqueiros was built in the grounds of the hotel, with murals by the painter David Alfaro Siqueiros. It was started early in the 1970s and completed before Siqueiros died in 1974. The building's exterior is a dodecahedron, while the interior is an octagon. It was built by the architects Guillermo Rossell de la Lama, Ramón Miquela Jáuregui and Joaquín Álvarez Ordonéz.

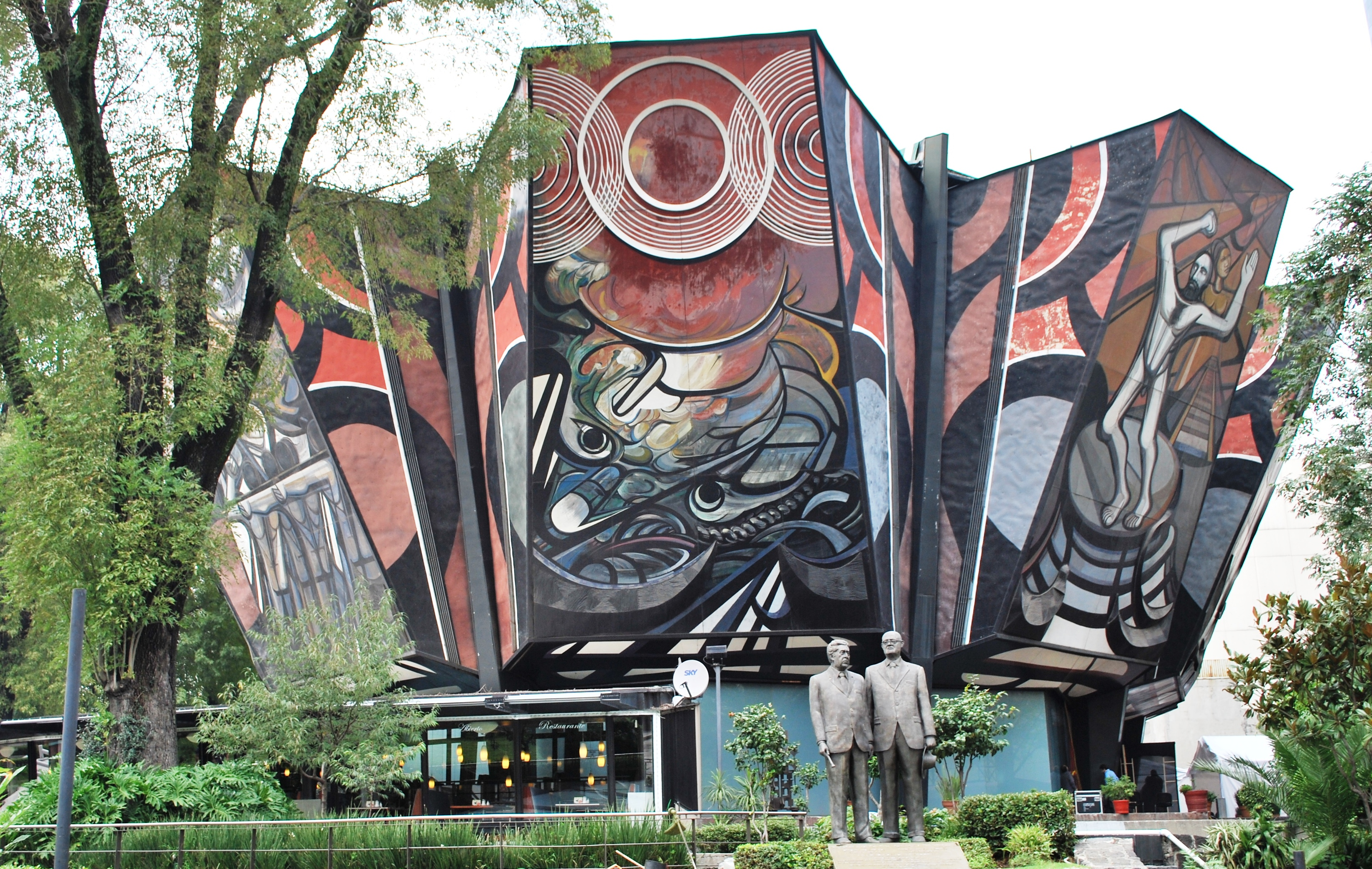
Polyforum Cultural Siqueiros, with statue of Sigueros and Suárez in front

Suárez built a workshop for Siqueiros in Cuernavaca, La Tallera, to help him work as efficiently as possible. The Polyforum has twelve huge exterior panels holding murals by Siqueros that depict the March of Humanity, showing the evolution from the past to the present and giving a view of the future. Most of the other surfaces of the building were also painted by Siqueros, making the building's exterior the largest mural in the world. The exterior mural covers over 120,000 square feet (11,000 m^{2}) and depicts the march of humanity on Earth towards the Cosmos. The interior depicts the march of humanity in Latin America. Most of the murals of the Polyforum were taken from drawings that Siqueros made while in prison for his revolutionary opinions in 1960–1964.

== Death and legacy ==
Don Manuel Suárez died in Mexico City in 1987 at the age of 91. He was buried in the pantheon of Santa Cruz del Pedregal.

Suárez amassed a collection of around 4,000 paintings. The Museo Mural Diego Rivera holds 50 pieces from his huge collection. He married twice and had twenty children: Manuel, Sergio, José, Jorge, Miguel Angel, Carlos, Lilia, Raquel, Silvia, Marisol, Margarita, Maricarmen, Concepción, Alfredo, Marcos, Manuel, Angélica, Beatriz, Ernesto and Fernando. In August 1987 it was reported that Hyatt would lend $30 million to the Suárez Group to complete the first 400 rooms on the ten highest levels of his hotel for what would now be called the Hotel de México Hyatt. Eventually the Hotel de México was converted into the World Trade Center, an office building, in 1995. In July 2005 the World Trade Center was sold at auction for $58 million by the government's Fondo Bancario de Protección al Ahorro (Fobaproa). The Casino de la Selva was demolished in the fall of 2002 and replaced by two large box stores.

== Sources ==
- Alarcón Azuela, Eduardo (2011), "Aquella primavera perdida... La historia del hotel Casino de la Selva en Cuernavaca", Bitácora arquitectura (in Spanish) (23)
- "Casino de la Selva, golpe al patrimonio artístico", Proceso.com (in Spanish), Comunicación e Información S.A. de C.V., 13 September 2003
- Castellanos, Antonio; Zuñiga, Juan Antonio (29 July 2005), "Se remató el World Trade Center en 630 millones de pesos", La Jornada (in Spanish)
- "Celebran mecenazgo de Suárez y Suárez", La Razón (in Spanish), 14 June 2012
- Contreras, Joseph (2009), In the Shadow of the Giant: The Americanization of Modern Mexico, Rutgers University Press, ISBN 978-0-8135-4655-1
- Flaherty, George F. (2016-08-16), Hotel Mexico: Dwelling on the '68 Movement, Univ of California Press, ISBN 978-0-520-29107-2
- Gallo, R. (2004-08-20), New Tendencies in Mexican Art: The 1990s, Palgrave Macmillan US, ISBN 978-1-4039-8265-0
- Gracia Noriega, Ignacio (23 November 2009), "Manuel Suárez: de Téifaros a México", Lne.es (in Spanish), Editorial Prensa Ibérica
- Hodge, Susie (2013-11-05), 50 Art Ideas You Really Need to Know, Quercus, ISBN 978-1-62365-179-4
- Mitchell, Stacy (2007), Big-box Swindle: The True Cost of Mega-retailers and the Fight for America's Independent Businesses, Beacon Press, ISBN 978-0-8070-3501-6
- "Muerto Manuel Suarez, Hyatt entra al Hotel De Mexico: Invierte 30 millones de pesos", Proceso (in Spanish), Comunicación e Información S.A. de C.V.
- Santa Cruz, Eduardo (2002-09-11), "Polyforum Cultural Siqueiros", in Daniel Balderston; Mike Gonzalez; Ana M. Lopez (eds.), Encyclopedia of Contemporary Latin American and Caribbean Cultures, Routledge, ISBN 978-1-134-78852-1
- ""Siqueiros era menos comunista que yo", dice Manuel Suárez "Somos símbolos de una raza y un mundo nuevos"", Proceso (in Spanish), 26 December 1981
- Walsh, Casey (2018), "8 Spa Tourism in Twentieth-Century Mexico", Virtuous Waters: Mineral Springs, Bathing, and Infrastructure in Mexico, University of California Press, pp. 137–154, ISBN 9780520291737, JSTOR 10.1525/j.ctt2204r3b.12
