= Olivia Guzmán =

Mexican sculptor

- Education: Academy of San Carlos and Escuela Nacional de Pintura, Escultura y Grabado "La Esmeralda"
- Known for: bronze sculpture
- Website: oliviaguzman.com

Olivia Guzmán is a Mexican sculptor whose work has been recognised with membership in Mexico's Salón de la Plástica Mexicana.

== Life ==
Guzmán began her studies at the Academy of San Carlos in 1976, first learning oil and watercolor techniques under Hermilo Castañeda, moving on to sculpting ceramics and wood along with restoration techniques and applying gold leaf at the Centro del Seguro Social in San Jerónimo under Saúl Moreno and Cristina Molina. She finished at the Escuela Nacional de Pintura, Escultura y Grabado "La Esmeralda" with Jorge de Santiago and becoming certified as an art teacher. During her career, Guzmán has worked in clay, cement, fiberglass, resins, bronze and marble, with more recent work involving chipped marble. Her works often have a "broken" or "incomplete" aspect to them as sections will be unrefined or even missing.

Her first individual exhibition took place in 1984 at the Universidad Autónoma Metropolitana, Azcapotzalco campus. Since then, she has had over 42 individual exhibitions and her works have appeared in over 60 collective shows. Mexican venues include the Salón de la Plástica Mexicana, the Universidad Autónoma del Estado de México, the Omar Alonso Gallery in Puerto Vallarta, Polyforum Cultural Siqueiros, the Parque de las Naciones in Mexico City. She has also exhibited her work abroad in South Korea, Spain and the United States. Her work can be found in individual and institutional collections in Mexico and abroad, in countries such as the United States, Canada, Indonesia, Malta, Chile, Cayman Islands, Switzerland, Israel and Bulgaria.
