= Benito Messeguer =

Spanish-born Mexican artist (1930–1982)

Undated portrait photograph

Benito Messeguer (born Benet Messeguer i Villoro; October 27, 1930 – October 19, 1982) was a Spanish-born Mexican artist, best known for his murals which continued much of the work of the Mexican muralism movement. His work was recognized with a tribute at the Palacio de Bellas Artes shortly before his death and membership in the Salón de la Plástica Mexicana.

== Life ==
Messeguer was born in Móra d'Ebre, in the Catalan province of Tarragona, Spain. During the Spanish Civil War, his family (which supported the Second Spanish Republic) left his hometown to live in Barcelona, where he studied painting under Enrique Assad. In 1944, when he was fourteen, the family moved to Mexico and when Messeguer became an adult, he obtained Mexican citizenship. In Mexico, he furthered his artistic studies at the Escuela Nacional de Pintura, Escultura y Grabado "La Esmeralda", a student of Diego Rivera and José Clemente Orozco who strongly influenced his work.

He died of leukemia in Mexico City at age 51.

== Career ==
He had over fifty individual and collective exhibitions of his work including the Bienal Interamericana de Pintura y Grabado in Mexico City (1960), the Tokyo Biennal (1961) and the Biennal de Jeunes in Paris (1961, 1963, 1965) and individual shows at the Museo de Arte Moderno and other venues.

His murals include La edad de oro at the Casino de la Selva (1958), El fenómeno de la comunicación lingüística at the Instituto Mexicano de la Audición y el Lenguaje (1963), Las luchas revolucionarias de México at the Unidad Habitacional Ermita-Zaragoza (1978), El Quijote, mensaje oportuno at the SHCP Cultural Center (1981) and El desarrollo histórico y económico-cultural del hombre at the economics school of the Universidad Nacional Autónoma de México (1983) .

In addition to producing art, Messeguer also served as the director of La Esmeralda and the director of the Centro de Estudios Superiores de Investigación Plástica of the Instituto Nacional de Bellas Artes .

His career was recognized by membership in the Salón de la Plástica Mexicana and in 1983 the Palacio de Bellas Artes presented a tribute-exhibition.

== Artistry ==
He was a painter (mostly oils), engraver and muralist, but most of his work was in murals.

His early influences were those of his teachers at La Esmeralda. Diego Rivera strongly influenced the anecdotic character of his compositions and José Clemente Orozco, with humanism and themes of the universal. Antonio Rodríguez Luna stated “Messeguer never forgot the social concerns of the old masters, nor the most appropriate method for representing human beings (figuration): but he rejected their followers who were content to repeat what had been created by their predecessors.” His works did not tell stories like that of classic Mexican muralism but they did not betray the movement pictorially or ideologically. Instead they were personal works with a popular ambiance, blending critical humor and a commitment to the disadvantaged.

Other influences in his work include that of Catalan architect Antoni Gaudí in the use of organic forms with emotive effect and Rembrandt’s use of the chiaroscuro effect. One principal example of the latter is the La creación y la economía, where a pool of intense light transcends the struggles between humanism and obscurantism. The work of his last ten years of life began to use paint as a malleable material, almost pastes to model in thick impastos to converge the qualities of mass, color and light.

In 1962 he exhibited with Francisco Moreno Capdevila and José Hernández Delgadillo as the Nueva Presencia group, also known as the Interioristas. He was not a member of the Generación de la Ruptura, with its stance against politically and socially charged art. Nor did Messeguer approve of the evolution of abstract art in Mexico although some elements of his work did stray towards it.
