= Casino de la Selva =

Hotel Casino de la Selva
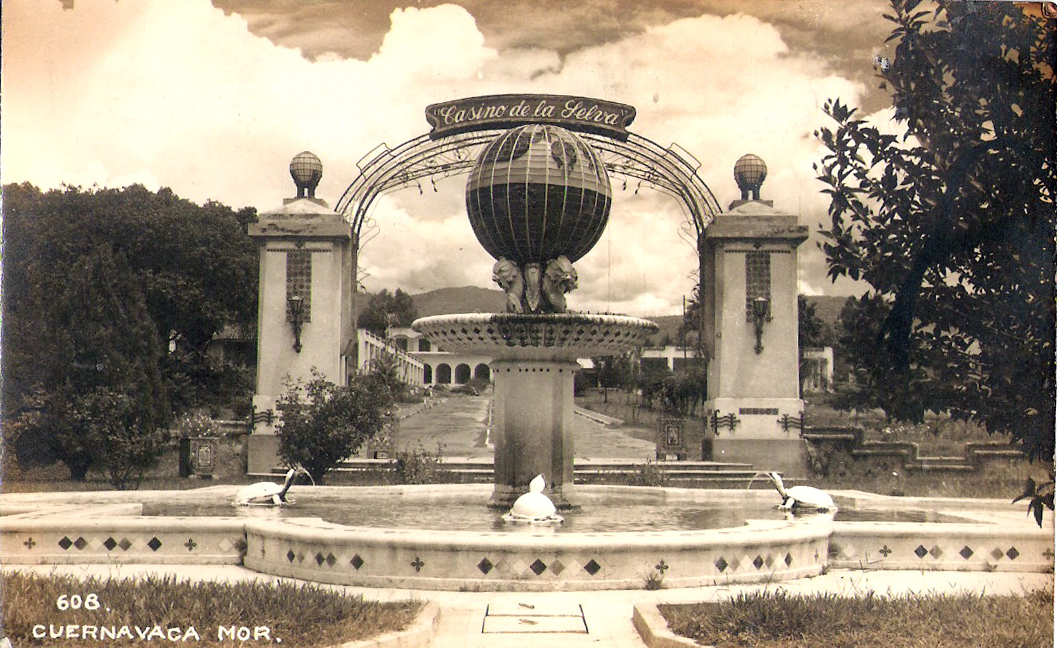
- Hotel entrance
- Interactive map of the Hotel Casino de la Selva area

General information
- Status: Defunct
- Type: Resort hotel
- Architectural style: Modern architecture
- Location: Cuernavaca, Mexico
- Coordinates: 18.933811°N 99.232836°W
- Completed: 1931
- Closed: 1996
- Demolished: 2002

Technical details
- Grounds: 10 hectares (25 acres)

The Hotel Casino de la Selva (Jungle Casino Hotel) was a hotel and casino located in the city of Cuernavaca, Mexico. The main building was opened in 1931 as a hotel and casino, but from 1934 it was used only as a hotel. Additions in the late 1950s included buildings designed by the architect Félix Candela that were roofed by reinforced concrete paraboloid shells. The interior was decorated with murals by well-known Mexican and Spanish artists. After the 1970s the hotel went into decline, and in 1994 was sold to a hotel chain that failed to pay taxes on the property. It was seized by the Mexican government and was auctioned off in 2001 as a site for construction of a discount store and a hypermarket. After demolition had begun there was a public outcry, and eventually some parts of the murals were preserved.

== History ==
=== Initial construction (1931) ===
Cuernavaca in the early 1930s held the homes of several former generals who later became presidents, Plutarco Elías Calles, Lázaro Cárdenas and Manuel Ávila Camacho. It was also often visited by foreigners, particularly Anglo-Saxons. The first constitutional governor of Morelos state, Vicente Estrada Cajigal^{(es)}, authorized construction of a casino complex in Cuernavaca by the Compañía Hispanoamericana de Hoteles. This was a consortium of Mexican businessmen backed by President Abelardo L. Rodríguez. Manuel Suárez y Suárez, an Asturian entrepreneur, was the building contractor. The Casino de la Selva was inaugurated in 1931 near the train station.

The layout was relatively simple. There was a large fountain at the entrance, then a main driveway between two blocks of rooms, one on each side. The drive led to the main hall, used as the gaming room. There was also an Olympic swimming pool, a pediment and some other facilities. The grounds contained bungalows set within the surrounding Amanalco Forest. Hundreds of the trees were at least 100 years old. Two of them were estimated to be over 1,000 years old. The 10 hectares (25 acres) site held springs and a wide variety of plant species. There was evidence of pre-Hispanic culture that could have been over 1500 years old. The pre-Columbian site was first excavated in the 1940s.

=== Early years (1931–46) ===
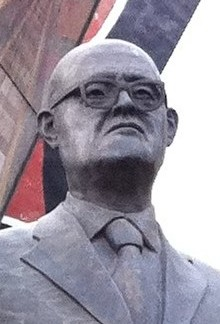
Detail of sculpture of Manuel Suárez at Polyforum Cultural Siqueiros, Mexico City

The Casino de la Selva was briefly the most luxurious watering spot in the Americas until the Garci-Crespo Hotel opened in Tehuacán in 1934. However, the owners were unable to pay their debts to the state or to the builders. Manuel Suárez was the main creditor and acquired the property in 1934. That year the new president Lázaro Cárdenas took office. One of his first decrees banned gambling in Mexico since he saw casinos as centers of vice. Suárez retained the property but ran it purely as a hotel. Suárez and the Valencian architect Jesús Martí Martín founded the company Vías y Obras, which built facilities in the ports of Veracruz, Acapulco and other cities. Suárez built the Hotel Mocambo in Veracruz, and was involved in other industries, including sugar mills.

In 1938 Malcolm Lowry moved to Cuernavaca to work on his novel Under the Volcano, and described the hotel in the first chapter,

The Hotel Casino de la Selva stands on a slightly higher hill just outside the town, near the railway station. It is built far back from the main highway and surrounded by gardens and terraces which command a spacious view in every direction. Palatial, a certain air of desolate splendour pervades it. For it is no longer a Casino. You may not even dice for drinks in the bar. The ghosts of ruined gamblers haunt it. No one ever seems to swim in the magnificent Olympic pool. The spring-boards stand empty and mournful. Its jai-alai courts are grass-grown and deserted. Two tennis courts only are kept up in the season.

=== Expansion (1946–70) ===
In 1946 the Casino de la Selva was closed so that Vías y Obras could undertake various enlargements under the direction of Martí. The two blocks of rooms were each given a second floor, and a French-style garden was laid out in the area between them. New rooms were added to the main building. Other additions included a large convention hall, a bowling alley and cafeteria, a walkway around the Olympic pool, two more pools and sandy areas to give a beach-like atmosphere. The effect was much like the Hotel Mocambo. Félix Candela came to Mexico to escape Francoist Spain and worked for Vías y Obras from 1942 to 1947. He helped the architect Martí in his renovation of the Casino de la Selva.

Candela is best known for his reinforced concrete shells, which he introduced to Mexico. These are based on hyperbolic paraboloids, in which straight beams can be used to build a saddle roof, and can cover large spans with minimal thickness. At the end of the 1950s the construction company of the brothers Félix, Antonio and Julia Candela built a dining room attached to an auditorium, and a non-denominational chapel in place of the fountain at the entrance, all with shell roofs. Candela's pupil, the architect Juan Antonio Tonda^{(es)}, designed the shells and about 30 bungalows in the south of the site and oversaw construction. Later the chapel was converted to a nightclub, the Club Jano, and then the Discoteca Mambo.

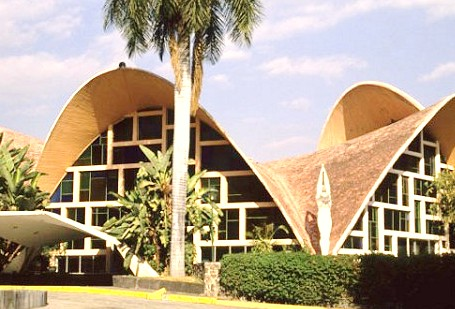
Dining room in front of the auditorium

The dining room, the Salón de los Relojes (Room of the Clocks), had a roof formed of five paraboloid sections with a large clock hanging from the central point where the arcs intersected. It showed the times of places around the world. The auditorium, reached via the Salón de los Relojes, had a single hyperbolic paraboloid roof and contained the mural La farándula (Showbiz) by the Mexican artist Francisco Icaza, a tribute to the German playwright Bertolt Brecht. After 1965 Suárez started various unfinished projects such as a monorail below the pools and a forum to hold large murals by David Alfaro Siqueiros. Later this project was transferred to Mexico City where it became the Polyforum Cultural Siqueiros, leaving the building at the Casino de la Selva unfinished. The result of these later works was increasing diversity of architectural styles and growing maintenance costs. Lilia Suárez, daughter of the owner, assumed management of the Casino de la Selva in 1966.

=== Decline and abandonment (1970–2001) ===
From the 1970s until his death Suárez put most of his energy into the Hotel de México (now the World Trade Center) in the Federal District, a project that grew out of control. The Casino de la Selva was neglected and used only by foreign tourists. Suárez died in 1987. After this the hotel was used as a spa, and was sometimes rented for events such as wedding celebrations and graduations. Cuernavaca continued to expand, but most development happened outside the city center, which had expanded to include the hotel. A bus station was built beside the hotel and in 1991 the Plaza Cuernavaca shopping center opened to its east. In 1994 Suárez's heirs sold the property to the Grupo Situr-Sidek, a hotel company. The deed of sale does not seem to have included any stipulation that the murals were to be preserved. In 1996 the group defaulted on $63.7 million of taxes it owed to the Mexican government, and the Ministry of Finance seized the property.

The Hotel Casino de la Selva was abandoned for several years and deteriorated quickly. The heritage authorities chose not to evaluate the property. Ownership was transferred to the Fondo Bancario de Protección al Ahorro (Fobaproa: Bank Fund for the Protection of Savings). By 2001 the buildings had deteriorated badly, with murals crumbling from neglect, bat guano on interior walls, and litter and human excrement covering the floor of the main salon that held some of the finest murals. The buildings and over 4 hectares (9.9 acres) of green land were sold in 2001 for 10 million pesos, well below market value. The cultural wealth contained in the property was not declared.

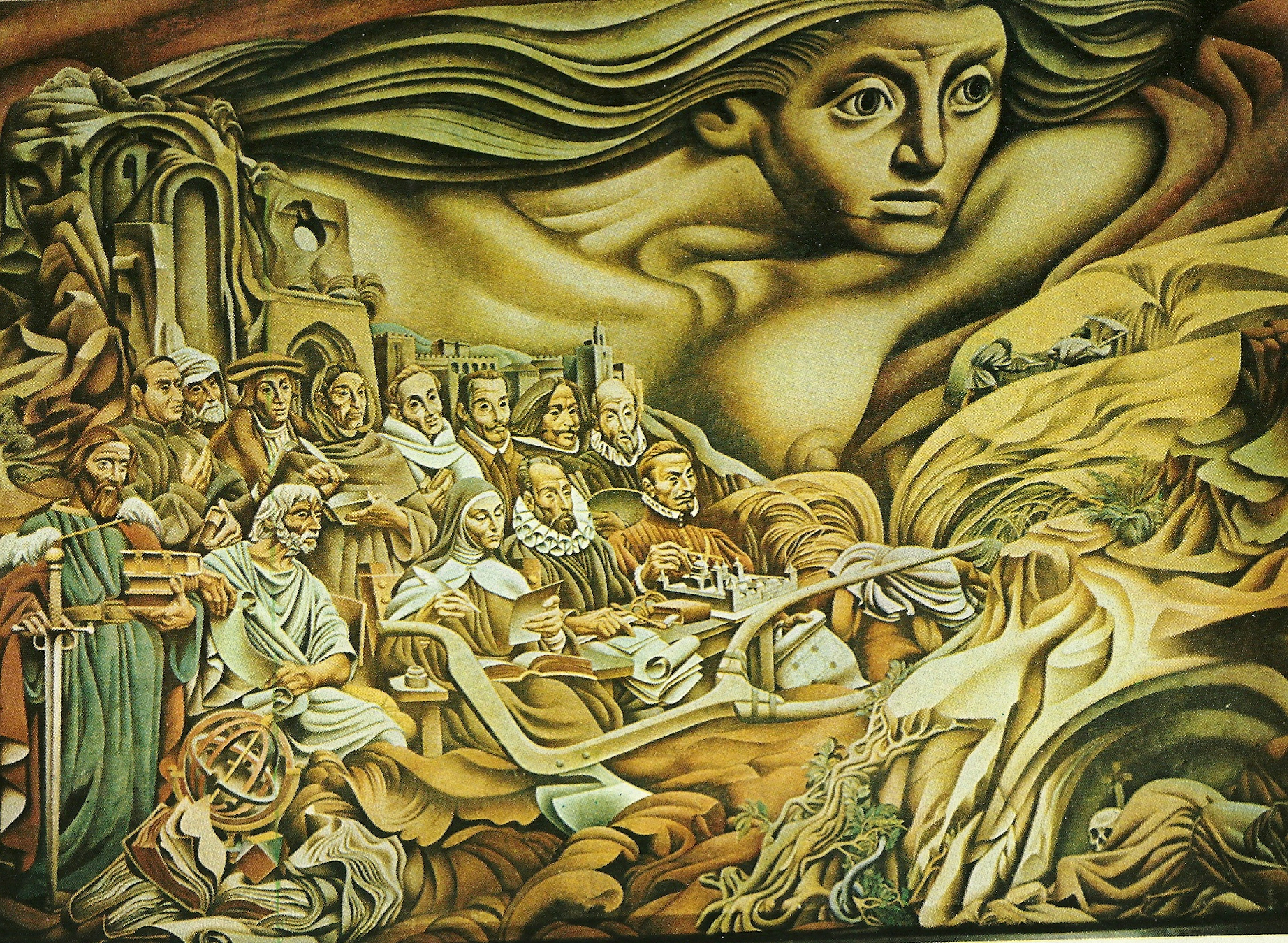
Fragment of the mural "La Hispanidad" by Josep Renau

== Artwork ==
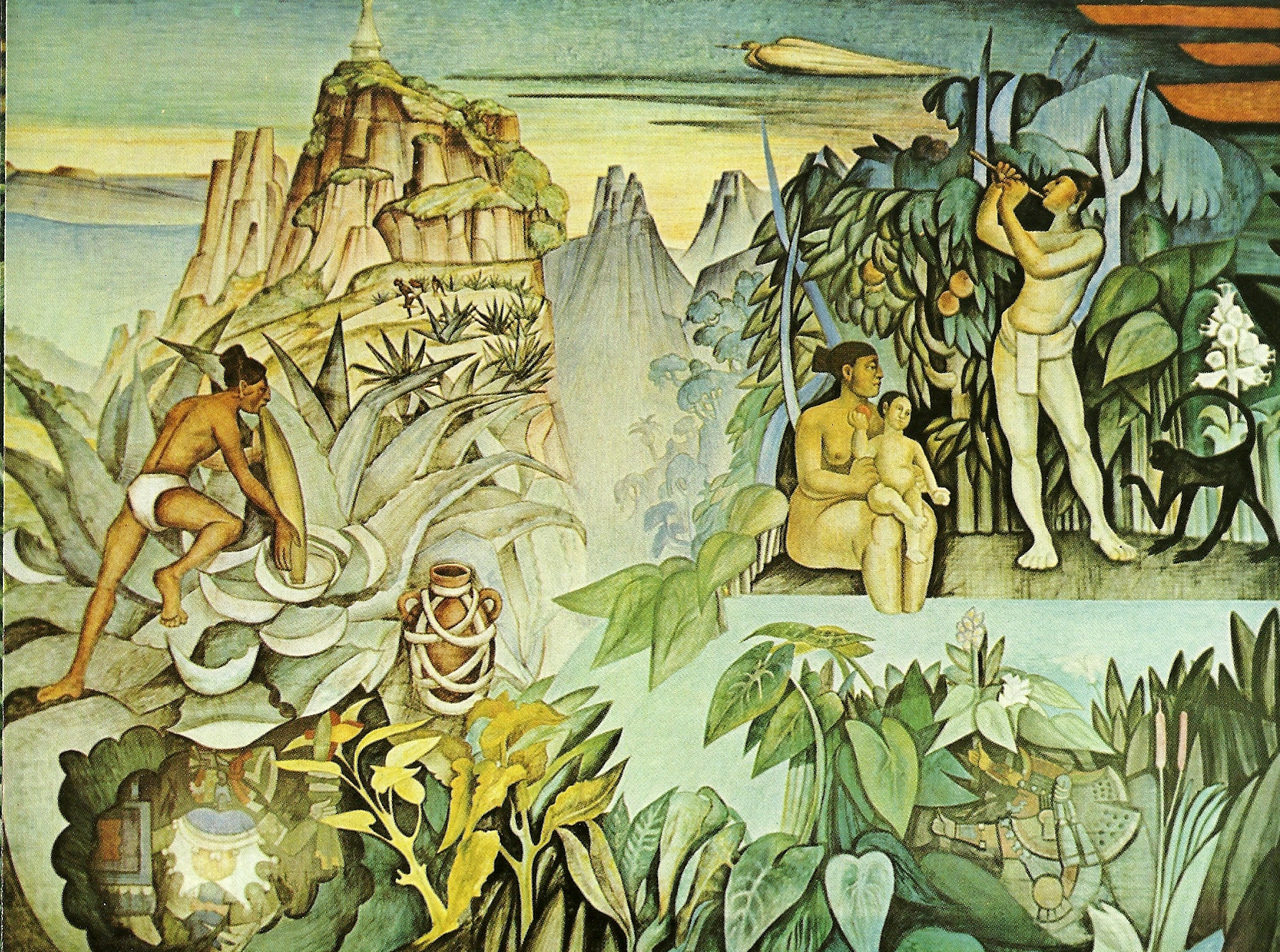
Fragmento of mural by the artist José Reyes Meza

Suárez wanted the hotel to be a gathering place for intellectuals and artists, and commissioned various works of art for the walls and gardens. He hired Mexican and Spanish artists such as José Reyes Meza and Josep Renau to decorate the walls with murals showing Mexican history from the pre-Columbian period to the modern age. The murals would cover an area of 600 square metres (6,500 sq ft). The hotel became the center of cultural activity in Cuernavaca and was visited by artists, writers and political activists.

The former gaming room in the main hall came to be called the Salón de los Murales. The Spanish Republican artist Josep Renau painted a mural there of "La Hispanidad" a history of the Iberian Peninsula from the time of the Phoenicians to the conquest of America. The other side of the room held a 1965 mural by José Reyes Meza that depicted indigenous culture in the Valley of Mexico. The hall also had a mural of The Apocalypse by Jorge Flores, a disciple of David Alfaro Siqueiros. Renau's Mural de la conformacion hispanica, painted with his wife Manuela Ballester^{(es)}, depicted the conquest and colonization of America by the Spanish and covered more than 300 square metres (3,200 sq ft). The walls of the rooms and corridors also held the work of David Alfaro Siqueiros, Dr. Atl, Benito Messeguer, Jorge González Camarena, Francisco Icaza, Victor Moscoso and others.

Sculptures in the gardens included pre-Hispanic allegories by Federico Canessi^{(de)} and works by Antonio Ballester. A large equestrian statue of Hernán Cortés by the Spanish sculptor Florentino Aparicio was installed late in 1962. Suárez provided the hotel with a pottery workshop directed by Aparicio, where several noted potters learned their art. In 1980 the ceramicist Gustavo Pérez Mirada was able to rent the workshop for a nominal sum with the help of his friend Ida Rodríguez Prampolini.

== Famous visitors ==
In 1969, the daughter of Manuel Suárez, Doña Lilia Suárez de Rossbach, was director of the hotel. She offered the author Carlos Monsiváis an old bungalow as a quiet space where he could write a book, his Días de guardar, published in 1971. Rafael Buñuel, the younger son of the filmmaker Luis Buñuel, spent six months living at the casino in 1971–72. He auditioned amateur local actors with the idea of staging his play "Las Diecisiete Cajas" (The Seventeen Boxes) which he had successfully mounted the year before as an Off-Off-Broadway Theater piece in New York City. The play was never produced in Cuernavaca, however. In 1971, Doña Lilia invited the well-known stage and film actor Carmen Montejo to start a theatre training program at the 500-seat Casino de la Selva Theater. Among many professional luminaries Sergio Jiménez came from Mexico City to teach classes. Montejo eventually founded the Tespis Theater Group. During the early 1970s Grupo Tespis, in addition to performing in a number of plays directed by Montejo, also produced professional plays. concerts, recitals, and dance performances including appearances by the Argentinian singer-songwriter Facundo Cabral, the Cante Jondo singer Enrique Morente, and the Flamenco dancer Pilar Rioja. The pianist Alfonso Morquecho also performed at the hotel.

The Mexican painter and muralist Gerardo Murillo, better known as Dr. Atl, was among the best-known guests. Dr. Atl would hold marathon conversations from three to four in the afternoon in the dining room with other visitors such as Mario Orozco Rivera and Benito Messeguer. A fragment of Dr. Atl's mural, Architectural view of the City of Puebla, is preserved in the Chapultepec Castle. Leonora Carrington lived in the casino while they built her house in Cuernavaca.

Jules Dassin visited with Luis Buñuel in 1969. They were making preliminary visits to Cuernavaca to sketch out plans for filming Under the Volcano, but the project fell through because they couldn't secure film rights from Joseph Losey.

== Demolition ==
The property was sold at auction in 2001 to a joint venture of the American discount retailer Costco and the Mexican Comercial Mexicana supermarket chain. The partner companies quickly began to clear the site for construction of two large stores, uprooting trees and tearing down many of the buildings. Costco said they would invest over $30 million in the Club de Precios (Price Club) store, which would generate 1,500 temporary and 500 permanent jobs. When the plans became public the Civic Front for the Defense of the Casino de la Selva was formed by local environmentalists, preservationists and small business owners, asking the city to maintain the hotel and turn the land around it into a park.

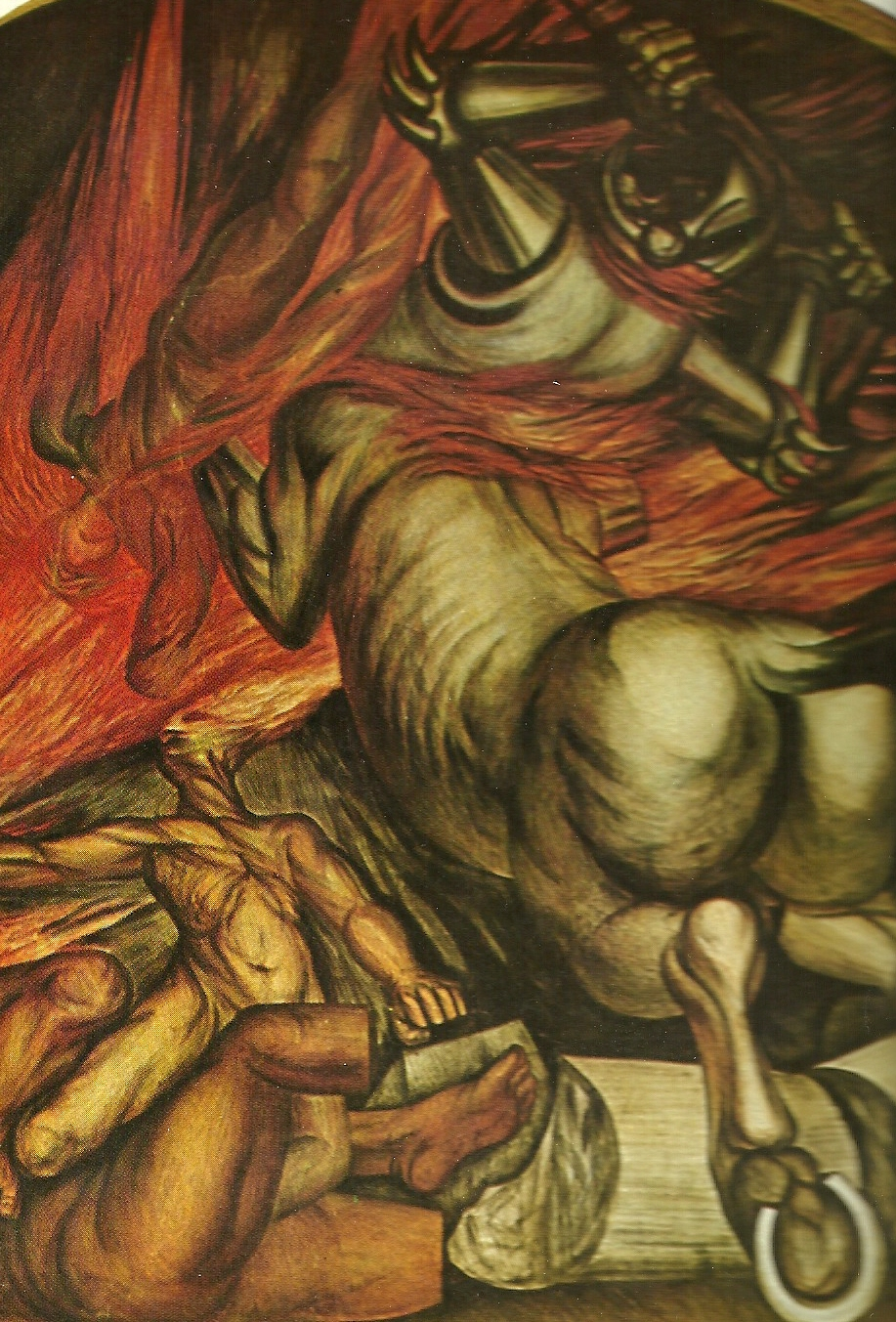
Fragment of one of the murals

The issue quickly gained national and international media attention as demolition began in July 2001. The painter José Reyes Meza was refused access to inspect the state of the murals. On 14 July 2001 it was reported that the Josep Renau Foundation of Valencia, Spain, had sent a communiqué to Kōichirō Matsuura of UNESCO asking him to exert pressure on the Mexican government to hold responsible those causing this "damage to the universal cultural heritage". The Civic Front organization filed lawsuits, organized a boycott of Costco's other Mexican stores, and held public demonstrations outside the construction site entrance.

A group of Morelos state deputies drafted a proposal to urge the Federal Instituto Nacional de Antropología e Historia (INAH) and Instituto Nacional de Bellas Artes (INBA) to conserve the historical and archaeological cultural heritage on the site. They described the damage to the murals due to demolition of part of the shell of the Casino de la Selva building as an act of aggression against the cultural heritage of humanity. They called on the City of Cuernavaca to take into consideration the opinion of the citizens, suspend the work and prepare a comprehensive plan for conservation and use of the cultural, historical and ecological resources.

In August 2002 demonstrators held a lengthy sit-in, calling for access to the site so they could count the remaining trees. On 21 August 2001 protestors blocked access to the property for eight hours before being evicted by the authorities. 31 of the demonstrators were arrested and accused of riot, sabotage, assault, blocking public roads and incitement to crime. On 23 August 2002 the state authorities transferred 31 opponents of the shopping centre project who had refused to pay bail to Atlacholoaya prison and deployed 360 troops around the entrance to the site to prevent the arrival of a group of supporters from San Salvador Atenco, México. Six days later 15,000 people marched in protest through downtown Cuernavaca. Eventually the company agreed to save the murals and part of the surrounding forest. The hotel was demolished in the fall of 2002. During the excavation figurines and prehispanic ceramics were found. The INAH tried to intervene but was too late to stop the work.

== Aftermath ==
Within a year the new Costco outlet and the new mega supermarket opened in two huge concrete blocks surrounded by a sea of asphalt. In 2003 the UN High Commission on Human Rights in Mexico condemned the project and criticized the local authorities for using excessive force in removing the protesters from the site. One of the organizers of the protests, Flor Guerrero, described the failure to protect the Casino de la Selva as symbolic of Mexico's acceptance of the U.S. free-trade gospel.

Our struggle to defend the Casino de la Selva was basically a struggle against neo-liberalism. We see neo-liberalism here in our country as an economic, cultural, and political penetration at every level. In Latin America today, it isn't armies that are conquering us, it's megastores, transnational corporations. The Casino de la Selva is a dramatic case that should be held up as an example on a global scale. It was a devastating attack against our culture, our art and our environment.

Another local resident gave a different view, saying "They said we were all against those stores, but the stores may bring more benefits than harm. New jobs and investment were created, and there's a greater variety of products to choose from in those stores. Besides, the Casino de la Selva hotel never belonged to the people."

Costco opened an art museum named the Museo Muros to hold the Renau and Reyes Meza murals that had been salvaged as well as the Gelman collection of Mexican art. A reinforced concrete shell was built next to the museum in imitation of the Salón de los Relojes. The shell was poorly executed and does not achieve the feeling of lightness that was characteristic of Candela's work. The museum was boycotted by the activists of the Frente Ciudadano Pro-Casino de la Selva and received very few visitors. In 2008 the Gelman collection was withdrawn and in November 2008 the museum became a branch of the Papalote Museo del Niño.

== Sources ==
- Alarcón Azuela, Eduardo (2011), "Aquella primavera perdida... La historia del hotel Casino de la Selva en Cuernavaca", Bitácora arquitectura (in Spanish) (23)
- Amador Tello, Judith (8 November 2011), "Reyes Meza: Los murales del Casino de la Selva no deben olvidarse", Proceso (in Spanish), Comunicación e Información S.A. de C.V., archived from the original on 2018-05-07
- Bautista, Juan (14 July 2001), "Piden castigo para los agresores de murales del Casino de la Selva", El Universal (in Spanish)
- Bravo, Jorge (27 June 2006), "El artista-intelectual: nuevas visiones en torno al Dr. Atl", Imágenes (in Spanish), Instituto de Investigaciones Estéticas UNAM
- "Casino de la Selva, golpe al patrimonio artístico", Proceso.com (in Spanish), Comunicación e Información S.A. de C.V., 13 September 2003
- Contreras, Joseph (2009), In the Shadow of the Giant: The Americanization of Modern Mexico, Rutgers University Press, ISBN 978-0-8135-4655-1
- Fernanda Mancebo, Ma. (Spring 2004), "La cultura del exilio", Aula-Historia Social (13), Fundacion Instituto de Historia Social: 49–64, JSTOR 40343158
- Gobierno del Estado de Morelos (2001-08-22), Punto de Acuerdo por el que se exhorta a las autoridades federales por conducto de L.N.A.H. e L.N.B.A. a la conservación del patrimonio cultural, historico y arqueologico existente dentro del perímetro del "Hotel Casino de la Selva" (PDF) (Publicación Oficial: 4134 Periódico Oficial "Tierra y Libertad") (in Spanish)
- Goldberg, Paul (Spring 2008), "The Costco Effect: Globalization and Aggression in Xavier Velasco's "El materialismo histérico"", Confluencia, 23 (2), University of Northern Colorado: 58–69, JSTOR 27923274
- Güemes, César (6 August 2001), "Necesario, Rescatar la Memoria que albergó el Casino de la Selva", La Jornada Perfil (in Spanish)
- Hanke, Lewis (August 1964), "More Heat and Some Light on the Spanish Struggle for Justice in the Conquest of America", The Hispanic American Historical Review, 44 (3), Duke University Press: 293–340, doi:10.2307/2511855, JSTOR 2511855
- Laxer, Gordon; Soron, Dennis (2006), Not for Sale: Decommodifying Public Life, University of Toronto Press, ISBN 978-1-55111-752-2
- Lowry, Malcolm (2000-02-03), Under the Volcano, Penguin Books Limited, ISBN 978-0-14-119067-9
- Miranda, Justino (24 August 2002), "Crece tensión en Morelos por hotel Casino de la Selva", El Universal (in Spanish)
- Mitchell, Stacy (2007), Big-box Swindle: The True Cost of Mega-retailers and the Fight for America's Independent Businesses, Beacon Press, ISBN 978-0-8070-3501-6
- Pérez, Gustavo (2005), "Mirada retrospectiva", Artes de México (74), Margarita de Orellana: 66–79, JSTOR 24316139
- Rossbach, Lilia (October 2013), "Lilia Rossbach", Debate Feminista, 48, Metis Productos Culturales S.A. de C.V.: 258–260, doi:10.1016/S0188-9478(16)30105-0, JSTOR 43832192
- Vargas, Angel (6 August 2001), "Las Autoridades Culturales mantienen evasivas y mutismo", La Jornada Perfil (in Spanish)
- Veitch, Douglas (2006-01-01), Lawrence, Greene and Lowry: The Fictional Landscape of Mexico, Wilfrid Laurier Univ. Press, ISBN 978-0-88920-570-3
- Walsh, Casey (2018), "8 Spa Tourism in Twentieth-Century Mexico", Virtuous Waters: Mineral Springs, Bathing, and Infrastructure in Mexico, University of California Press, pp. 137–154, ISBN 9780520291737, JSTOR 10.1525/j.ctt2204r3b.12
