= La Tallera =

Art space in Cuernavaca, Mexico

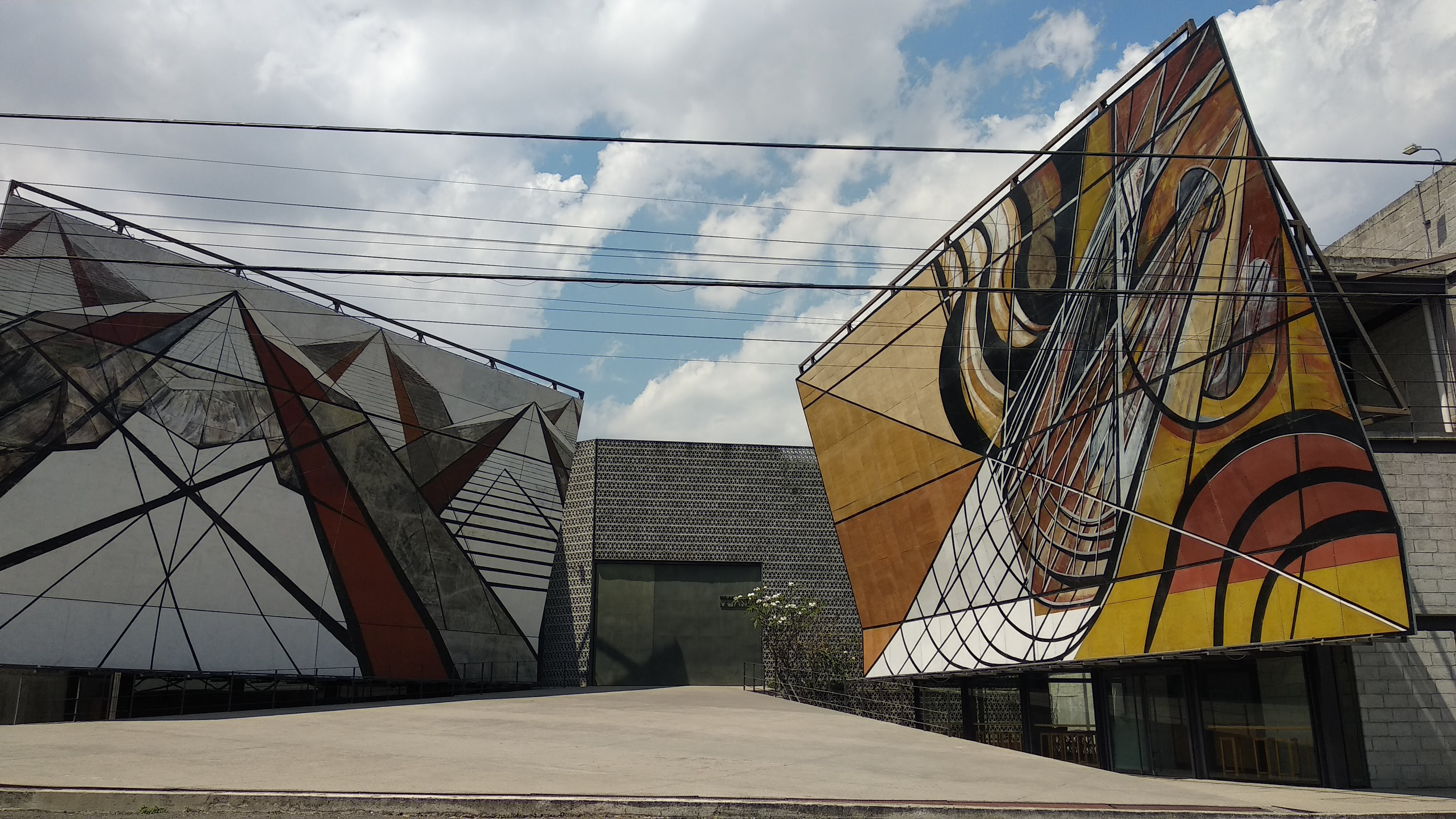
La Tallera, with murals by David Alfaro Siqueiros

La Tallera is a museum and a cultural center, in Cuernavaca, Morelos. It used to be the painter David Alfaro Siqueiros' workshop, and in recent years, it has become one of the most important art spaces in Mexico. In the artist's own words: "the space was born of an idea that Diego Rivera and I had since 1920, that is, the creation of a real workshop for Mural Painting; here the different techniques, materials, paintings, perspectives and geometric aspects will be rehearsed".

Maybe it was the first workshop of Muralism on the world. "A workshop," Siqueiros said "huge, big, full of machines, with mobile scaffolds, with chemical laboratories to prove the durability of the colors, with plastic materials, without the suffering of limitation, with a photograph department, with film cameras, with everything, everything that a muralist need, also with elements and accessories to dig in the dark field of the colors and the relativity of the geometrical forms in the active space. It will be an enormous barn with light, but without doors. To get in there, we will make an underground passage. Nobody would know the target".

The idea took place when Don Manuel Suárez y Suárez – a well-known patron of the arts— asked him to develop 18 paintings for the Congress Hall of the Hotel Casino de la Selva in Cuernavaca. Later, Siqueiros was put into jail and there he conceived the idea that instead of canvases, he would make a Mural Painting of great proportions. In his cell, Siqueiros painted approximately 200 images that served the mural's theme.
