= Frente Cívico =

Mexican social movement

The Frente Cívico Pro-Defensa del Casino de la Selva is a social movement made up of several organizations in Mexico. Its mission is to defend the environment, universal culture and the quality of life. It originated with the defence of the 3200 year Olmec archeological site Gualupita I, historic murals, and centenarian trees at the Casino de la Selva in Cuernavaca. It has led a campaign against Costco finding that the company is responsible destruction of both the environment and world cultural heritage.

The organization is known for its "group learning."

The organization received the National Mendez Arceo Human Rights Award in 2004. It also lobbied a bill from the Congress (Punto de Acuerdo) to protect the collective Human Rights of the people of the city.

On September 25, 2019 Twitter blocked the organization's account claiming that declaring Trump a murderer for not supporting environmental policies is a form of harassment. The organization declared the social network platform a violator free speech.
