= Hotel de México =

Building in Mexico City

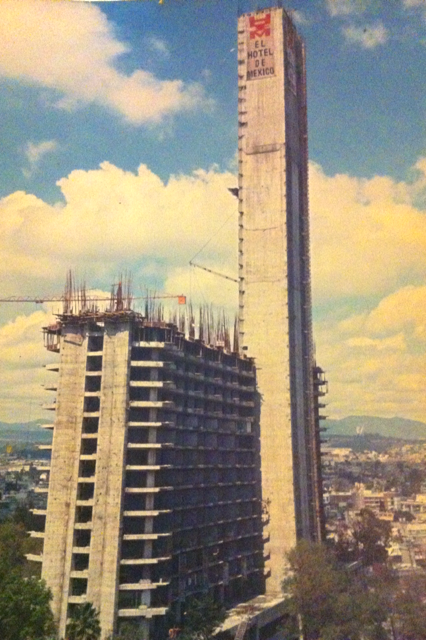
- The hotel under construction
- Interactive map of the Hotel de México area

General information
- Location: Mexico City, Mexico
- Coordinates: 19.3945°N 99.1744°W

The Hotel de México was a planned hotel that would have been built in Mexico City, Mexico. Started by the entrepreneur Manuel Suárez y Suárez in 1966, had it been completed, it would have been the largest hotel in the Americas. The project ran out of control and was never completed. After Suárez died in 1987 it stood unfinished for several years before being converted into an office building named the World Trade Center.

== Concept ==
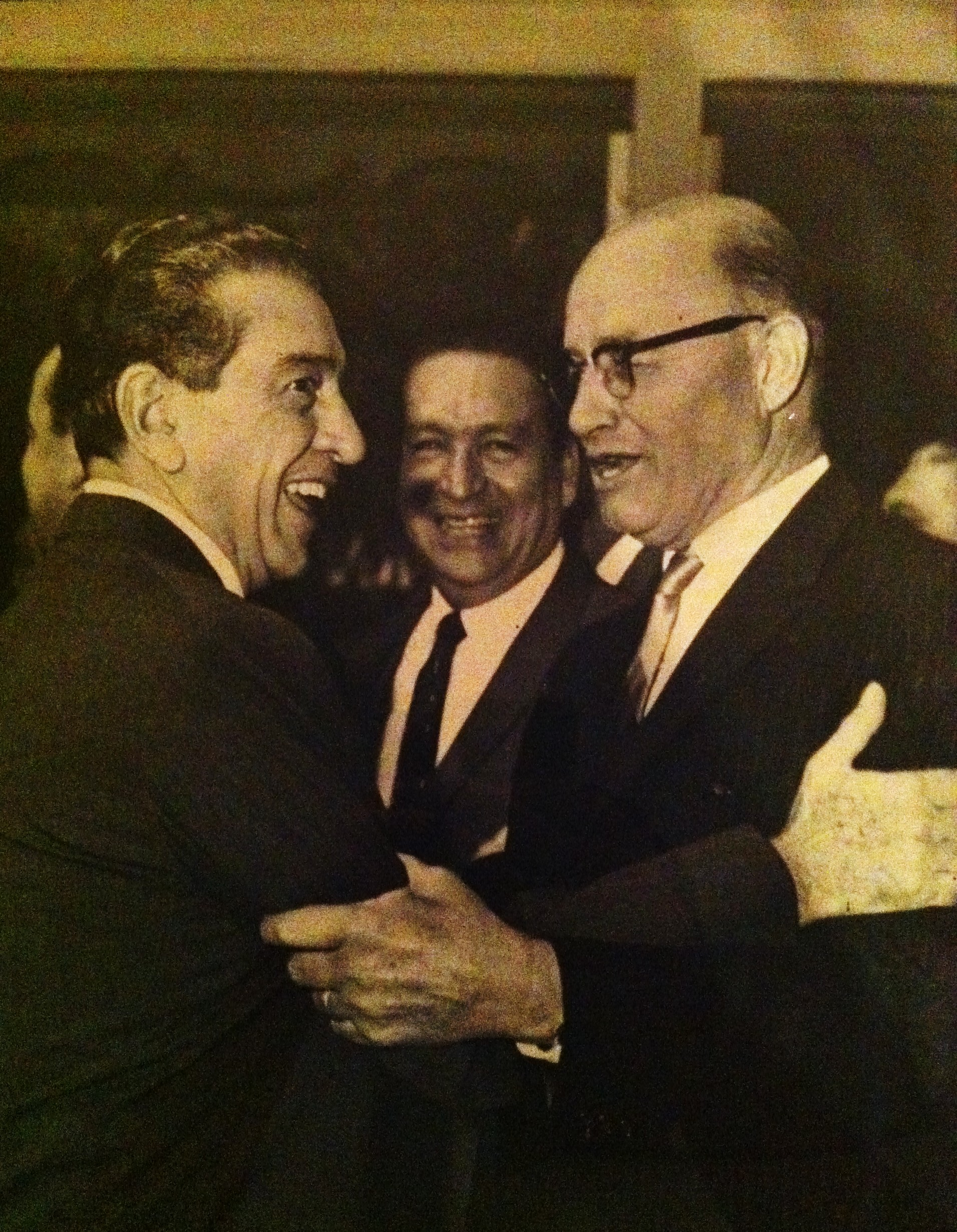
Suárez (right) with López Mateos

In 1966 the entrepreneur Manuel Suárez y Suárez embarked on building the Gran Hotel de México. Suárez had made his fortune in various infrastructure projects including water supply systems, canals and railways, and in sugar mills that were later nationalized. He conceived the idea of building a major business and tourist complex named Mexico 2000, centered around the huge Hotel de México. The architect was Guillermo Rossell de la Lama. The hotel was to be open in time to receive visitors to the 1968 Summer Olympics in Mexico City. It would be the tallest, largest and most technologically advanced building in the country. The project included both public and private investment.

The Parque de Lama was used as the site for the project. The hotel was to be the largest in the Americas, 237 metres (778 ft) high with 1,500 rooms. It was to be 51 stories high with 1,508 hexagonal rooms that could house 3,100 guests. A panoramic elevator would be able to carry 100 tourists, and 19 other elevators would carry normal passengers. There would be one covered and one open air panoramic terrace. There would be four cafeterias, six restaurants and 13 bars, with a revolving restaurant on the top floor, five reception halls, a 3000-person convention room, a 21,500 square feet (2,000 m^{2}) spiral-shaped shopping mall, a theatre, museum and so on. Parking would be provided for 2,000 cars. A heliport would be equipped with customs facilities. A high-speed monorail would connect the hotel to the Casino de la Selva in Cuernavaca.

== History ==
Both Suárez and Rossell were closely associated with the Institutional Revolutionary Party (PRI). Rossell used neohumanistic jargon like "global communication and fraternity" to promote the idea that the hotel project reconciled capitalism with revolution. The adjacent Polyforum by the well-known dissident artist David Alfaro Siqueiros was used to reinforce this message. In 1971 an exhibition about the hotel was shown in Paris, Madrid and New York. It included a scale model, drawings and photographs. Rossell presented the project to Franco-Mexican diplomats at the Grand Palais in Paris, accompanied by Siqueros and the Minister of Tourism Miguel Alemán Valdés. He claimed it would act as a vehicle for reconciliation of postwar ethnic, linguistic and geopolitical differences, and would help reunite the physical and social urban fabric of Mexico city.

From the 1970s until his death Suárez put most of his energy into the project, which grew out of control. An interview in 1978 noted that progress had been very slow, caused in part by changes in engineers. Suárez, now 82 years old, said the hotel was worth around 1,200 million pesos in its current state, but still needed 800 million to be completed. That investment could perhaps be realized by liquidation of the sugar mills. There was some question about whether the state-administered mills, which were running below capacity, could be valued that high. As delays continued there was growing tension between Suárez and the elite of the PRI, which disputed claims that the hotel could symbolize the enlightened sovereignty of the state, resolving social, urban and political problems and refused to authorize discounted loans to complete the project. Financing problems were caused by the peso crises of 1976 and 1982. Suárez died in Mexico City in 1987 at the age of 91. The building was unfinished when he died, and remained an unfinished skeleton for many years.

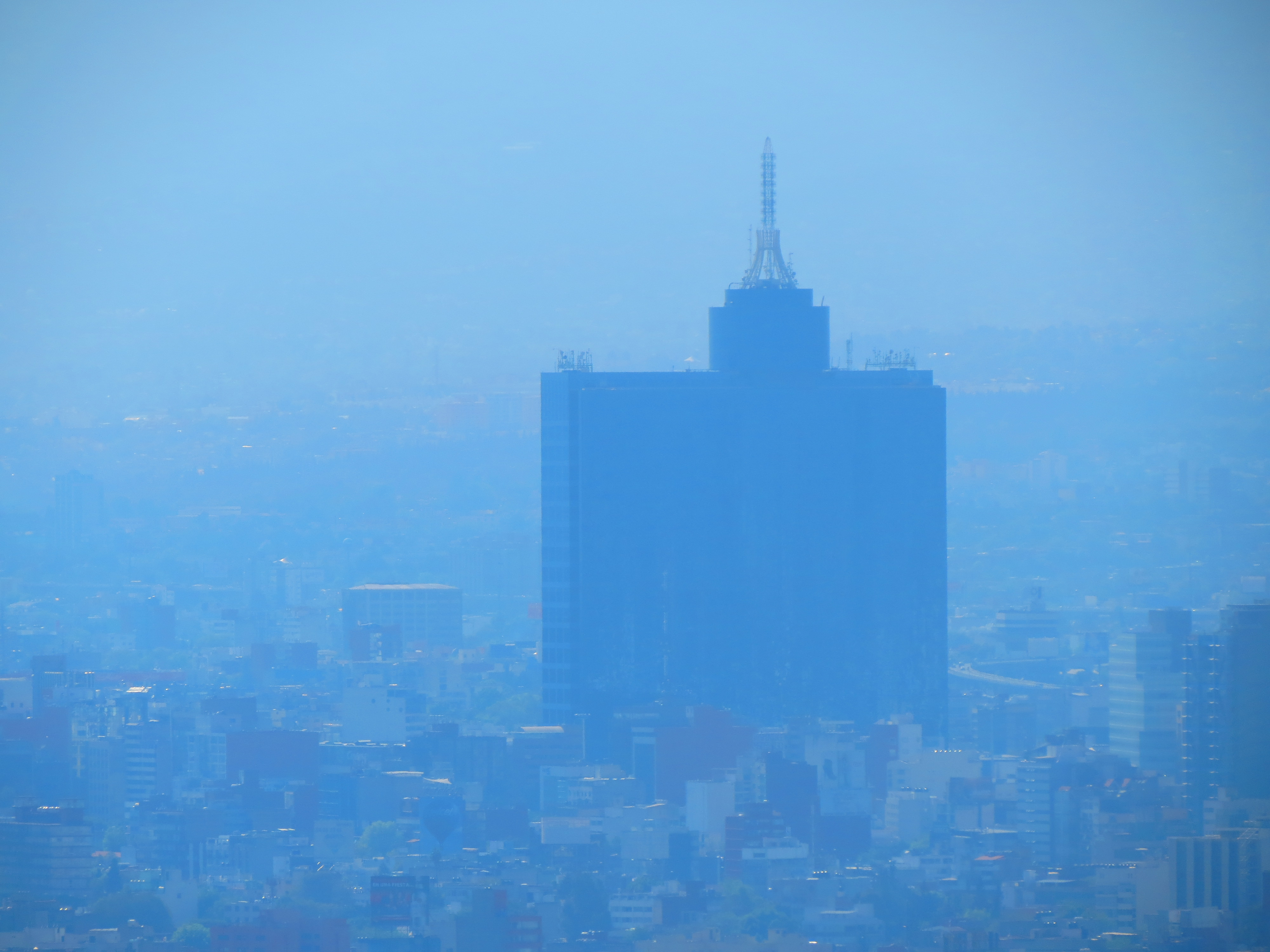
World Trade Center in 2013

In August 1987 it was reported that Hyatt would lend $30 million to the Suárez Group to complete the first 400 rooms on the ten highest levels of what would now be called the Hotel de México Hyatt. The work was resumed and abandoned several times. The Grupo Gusto bought the shell of the building to convert it into the World Trade Centre Mexico City, an office space, inaugurated by President Carlos Salinas on 19 November 1994. More than US$500 million was to be spent on the conversion. When completed in 1996 the complex would include a Presidente Intercontinentale hotel, a convention center, a mall and a parking lot for 8,500 cars.

At the start of the 1990s the office of Gutiérrez Cortina Arquitectos was commissioned to redesign and convert the building into the World Trade Centre México. Architectural design and overall coordination was assigned to Bosco Gutiérrez Cortina, and Arturo Guendulain Méndez directed structural redesign. The architectural style was changed and the width increased to give greater rigidity. A blue glass facade was added, hiding the concrete structure. Eventually the World Trade Center opened in 1995. In July 2005 the World Trade Center was sold at auction for $58 million by the government's Fondo Bancario de Protección al Ahorro (Fobaproa).

== Polyforum ==
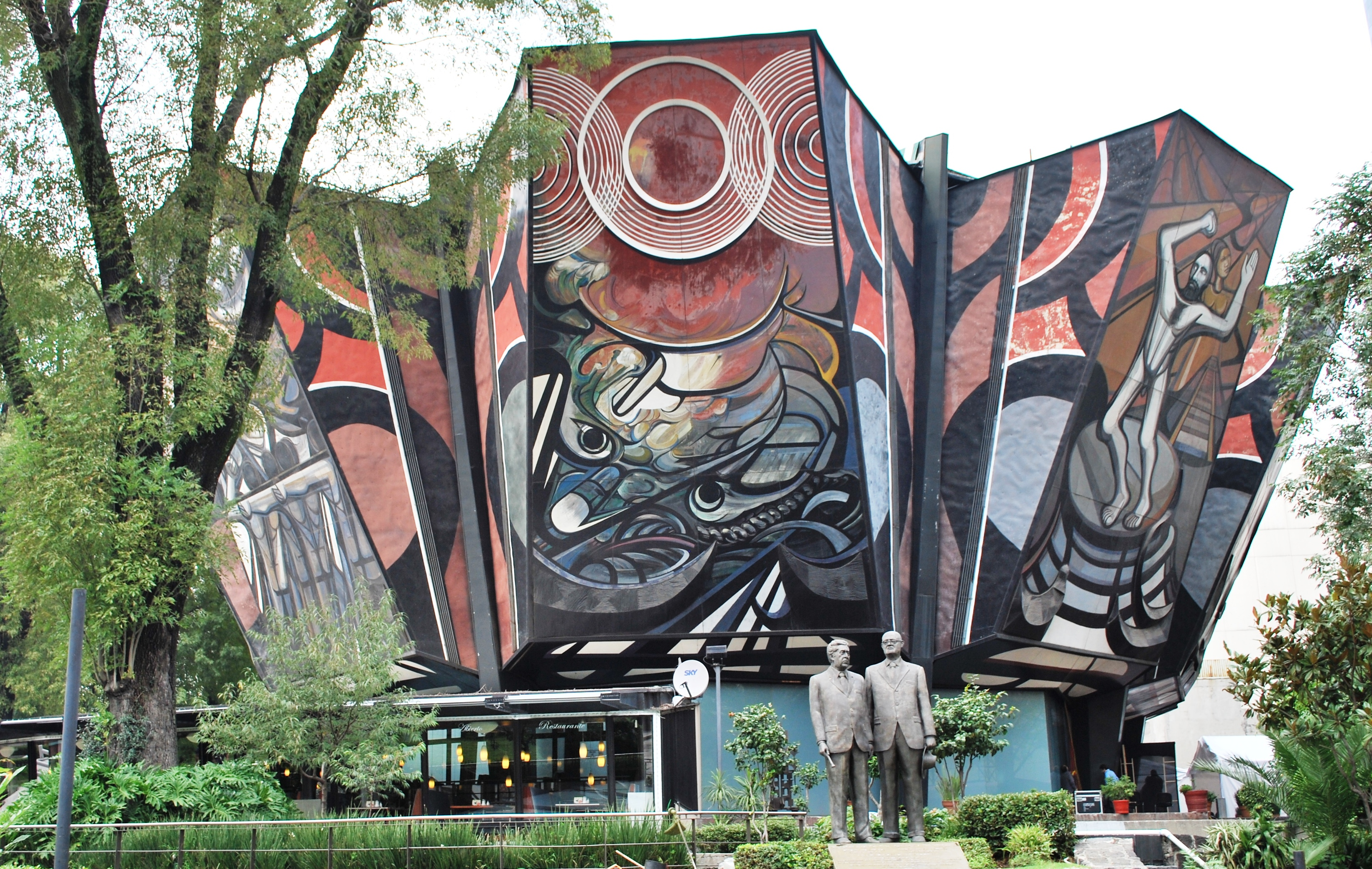
The Polyforum. A statue of Siqueros and Suárez stands in front.

Suarez first approached Siqueros in 1960, and in 1965 commissioned him to paint a mural for his Hotel de la Selva in Cuernavaca. In 1966 the mural plan was expanded and transferred to the Hotel de Mexico, where the mural would become a tourist attraction pulling customers to the hotel. President Gustavo Díaz Ordaz may have suggested the change to make the mural as accessible to tourists as possible. The architects Rossell and Ramón Miquela Jáuregui worked with Siqueros to design a diamond-shaped building that would present a huge surface for his mural. Inside there were areas to stage plays, dance performances, concerts and art exhibitions.

The Polyforum was started early in the 1970s and completed before Siqueiros died in 1974. The building's exterior is a dodecahedron, while the interior is an octagon. It was built by the architects Guillermo Rossell de la Lama, Ramón Miquela Jáuregui and Joaquín Álvarez Ordonéz. The Polyforum mural of the "March of Humanity" by Siqueros acknowledges the potential of technological progress but is critical of the failure of the Mexican Revolution to achieve freedom and social justice.

== Sources ==
- Alarcón Azuela, Eduardo (2011), "Aquella primavera perdida... La historia del hotel Casino de la Selva en Cuernavaca", Bitácora arquitectura (in Spanish) (23)
- Briante, Susan (2004), "Hotel de México", Creative Nonfiction (23: Mexican Voices: Crónica de Crónicas), Creative Nonfiction Foundation, JSTOR 44363081
- Castellanos, Antonio; Zuñiga, Juan Antonio (29 July 2005), "Se remató el World Trade Center en 630 millones de pesos", La Jornada (in Spanish)
- Contreras, Alejandro Rojas (2012), Proyecto Arquitectonico En Zonas Sismicas (in Spanish), Palibrio, ISBN 978-1-4633-3008-8
- Flaherty, George F. (2016-08-16), Hotel Mexico: Dwelling on the '68 Movement, Univ of California Press, ISBN 978-0-520-29107-2
- Gallo, R. (2004-08-20), New Tendencies in Mexican Art: The 1990s, Palgrave Macmillan US, ISBN 978-1-4039-8265-0
- Garcia Cortes, Adrian (2001), Década Sinaloense Diez Historias Para Replicar, UDO, ISBN 978-968-6336-12-2
- Gracia Noriega, Ignacio (23 November 2009), "Manuel Suárez: de Téifaros a México", Lne.es (in Spanish), Editorial Prensa Ibérica
- "Muerto Manuel Suarez, Hyatt entra al Hotel De Mexico: Invierte 30 millones de pesos", Proceso (in Spanish), Comunicación e Información S.A. de C.V.
- Santa Cruz, Eduardo (2002-09-11), "Polyforum Cultural Siqueiros", in Daniel Balderston; Mike Gonzalez; Ana M. Lopez (eds.), Encyclopedia of Contemporary Latin American and Caribbean Cultures, Routledge, ISBN 978-1-134-78852-1
- Stein, Philip (1994), Siqueiros: His Life and Works, International Publishers Co, ISBN 978-0-7178-0706-2
