= Pilar Rioja =

Mexican dancer

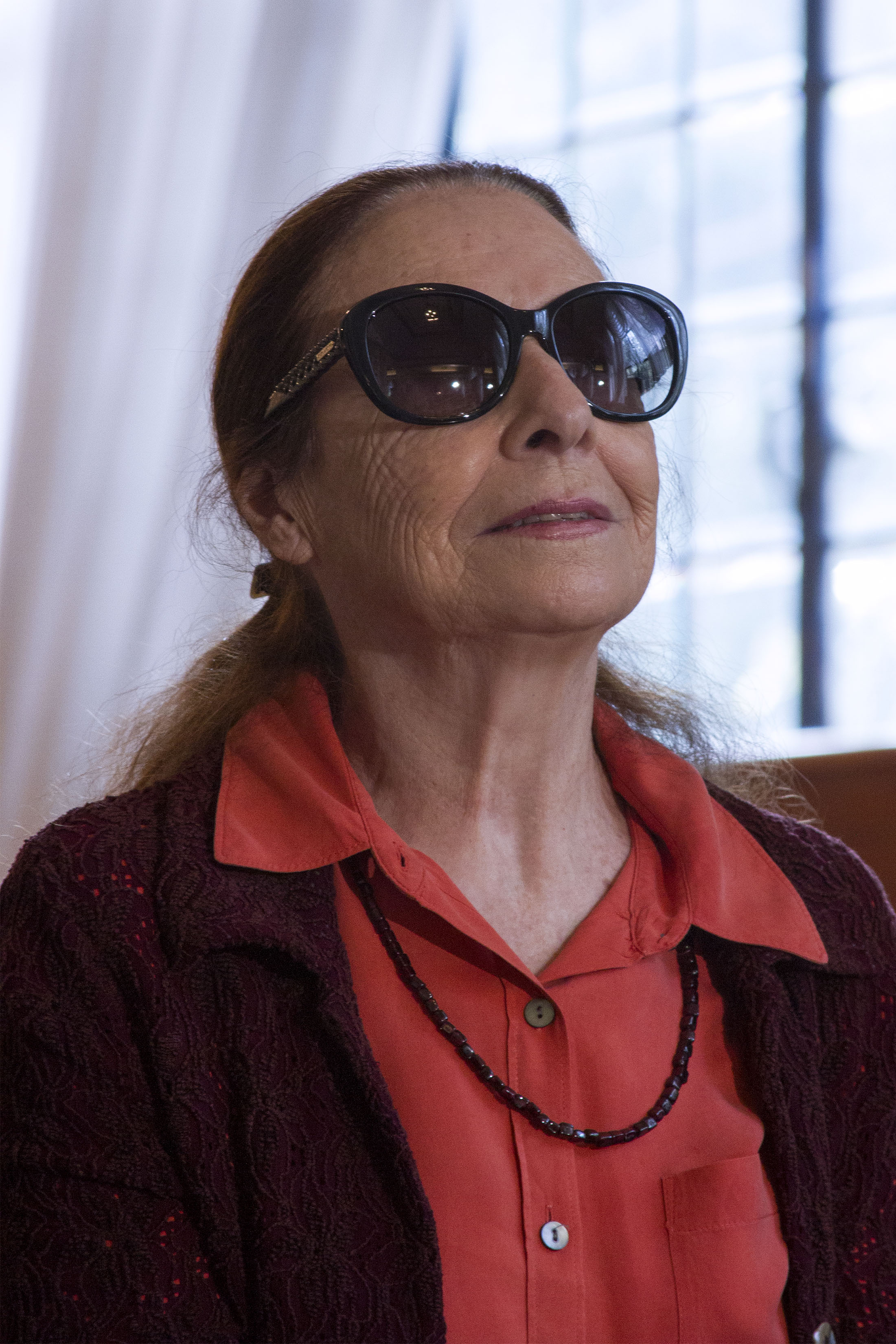
- Pilar Rioja (2015)
- Born: María del Pilar Rioja del Olmo; September 13, 1932 (age 93); Torreón, Coahuila, Mexico
- Occupations: dancer; choreographer
- Career
- Dances: bolero dance; folkloric dance; classical dance; stylized dance; flamenco dance; castanets player

María del Pilar Rioja del Olmo (Torreón, Mexico, September 13, 1932) is a Mexican dancer who focused her career on Spanish dance.

== Biography ==
Her training included mastering all branches of this dance: the bolero school, the folkloric, the classical, the stylized, and the flamenco dance. Her contribution was the "innovative idea of introducing castanets into dance, with Italian and Spanish baroque music", an idea that she derived from her work with Domingo José Samperio, who invented "concerted crotalogy". It is also considered to be characterized by fusing the flamenco tradition with traditional Mexican dances. In the U.S., she was called the "María Callas of dance".

Since 2003, Rioja has won program support for the creation of the Fondo Nacional para la Cultura y las Artes (FONCA), conducting research in several areas. The investigations she has carried out include:

- Abriendo puertas a la expresión (2012).
- Danzas de ida y vuelta - mestizaje (2013).
- Mis historias-autobiografía (2013-2014).
- La influencia de intelectuales y artistas en mi danza (2015).
- La escuela bolera del siglo XVIII (2016).

== Awards and honours ==
- Diploma of Honor by the Council of Women of Mexico. Mexico City, January 30, 1965.
- Recognition by the International Cervantino Festival. Guanajuato, April – May 1978.
- Recognition for the artistic and cultural work of Pilar Rioja on the 75th Anniversary of the city of Torreón. September 1982.
- ACE Award, by the Association of Entertainment Chroniclers of New York. USA, May 19, 1983, and May 21, 1987.
- Vanguard Award for The Desis. USA, May 16, 1990.
- Tribute and INBA medal for "A life in dance". Mexico City, April 27, 1991.
- Tribute as Mexican Ambassador of Spanish Dance Art. Mexico City, October 7, 1995.
- Recognition by the Mexican Cultural Institute of New York. USA, November 1999.
- Medal and diploma "My Life in the Theater" awarded by the UNESCO International Theater Institute. May 27, 2001.
- Inauguration of the Center for Artistic Initiation CINART "Pilar Rioja". Torreón, July 19, 2003.
- Tribute from the “El Borceguí” Footwear Museum. Mexico City.
- Cultural Borders Diploma from the Institute of Fine Arts and the Cervantino Festival.
- Medal awarded by Amalia Hernández, director of the Ballet Folklorico de México. Mexico City.
- Homage and presentation of the book on Pilar Rioja by the writer Alberto Dallal at the Palacio de Bellas Artes. Mexico City.
- Xochipilli Award 2014 and Conaculta tribute for her contribution to Spanish dance and her career. Mexico City, March 13, 2014.
- Tribute of the company Akais Chindos Producciones in the Lunario of the National Auditorium. Mexico City, July 4, 2015.
- Tribute and award within the framework of the International Festival of Contemporary Iberian Dance. Querétaro, July 24, 2015.
- Tribute "Celebrating Pilar Rioja" at the Esperanza Iris City Theater. Mexico City, August 14, 2015.
- Tribute and gold medal within the framework of the International Festival of Mayan Culture 2015 (Ficmaya). October 21, 2015.
- Tribute, plaque and silver castanet at the Isauro Martínez Theater. Torreon, May 26, 2016.

== Selected works ==
=== Choreography ===
- "Retablo del mirlo blanco".
- "Teoría y juego del Duende".
- "Bailes de cuenta y cascabel".
- "Mística y erótica del Barroco".
- "La monja".
- Qué pena negra la mía".
- "Ritmos".
- "Tener la esperanza muerta".
- "Tres danzas - Carlos Surinach".
- "Canciones a Pilar Rioja".
- "¡Oh, blanco muro de España!".
- "Yerma".
- "Habanera - Carretero".
