= José Reyes Meza =

Mexican painter and costume designer (1924–2011)

José Reyes Meza (November 23, 1924 – October 31, 2011) was a Mexican painter, costume and set designer, who helped to found a number of cultural institutions in Mexico. Reyes Meza began his artistic career principally in theater, although he was an active painter and even bullfighter in his early days. Painting became prominent starting in the 1970s, working on murals in various parts of Mexico as well as exhibiting canvas works in Mexico and abroad. The artist is a founding member of the Salón de la Plástica Mexicana and his work has been acknowledged by tributes, various awards and an art museum in Nuevo Laredo named after him.

== Life ==
José Reyes Meza was born in Tampico, Tamaulipas . His mother was only sixteen at the time and his parents separated soon after his birth. He then went with his mother to live in nearby Altamira. He grew up in a very rural area on the Gulf coast with lagoons such as the Champayan Lagoon, filled with alligators, birds and water plants. The area is also part of the Huasteca region of Mexico so he grew up on native music such as the huapango, learning to play this music on the guitar, the jarana huasteca and an instrument called the “tres cubano.” On occasions during his childhood, Reyes traveled on a barge with his uncles to sell provisions to local ranchers sent by his grandmother. These experiences later influenced his artwork, often conserving his childhood experiences.

Later in childhood, he went to live with his father, whose occupation was metal engraving and jewelry work. He described his father as someone “very close to aesthetic expression.” His father introduced him to bullfighting and the theater. He tried t learn his father's trade but did not like it, so he took a job at the age of eleven as a cook's helper at the dining hall at a local oil refinery. In his free time, he drew, giving his works to the refinery workers. In recognition of his talent, the workers from the payroll department arranged a stipend to allow him to attend the Academy of San Carlos in Mexico City, where Reyes arrived in 1938, at age fourteen. Reyes Meza studied at the school from 1938 to 1948 under teachers such as Benjamín Coria, Francisco Goitia, Francisco de la Torre and Luis Sahagún.

Deciding he needed other studies as well, in 1942 he enrolled in classes with the Instituto Nacional de Antropología e Historia, concentrating on topics such as mythology, religion and magic. With other students at the Instituto such as Xavier Rojas, he founded the Teatro Estudiantil Autónoma, remaining very active with this theater project which led to an award for best set design in 1957.

Shortly after arriving to Mexico City, he married María Luisa Algarra, a writer and lawyer who arrived to Mexico fleeing the Spanish Civil War. The artist met her at the opening of her first play in Mexico. This union produced two daughters María and Fernanda. The marriage lasted twelve years, until María Luisa's death at the age of forty two. He then married Gabriela Orozco Marín, the daughter of painters Carlos Orozco Romero and María Marín. This union produced Mariana Gabriela, who also became a painter. Through his life his passions remains art, bulls and cooking. He stated that if he had not become a painter, he probably would have become a cook or bullfighter, with a passion for both since childhood. From his teen years until the late 1950s, he fought bulls when he could as a secondary occupation. This interest also is reflected in a series of drawings and oil paintings.

Reyes Meza died at the age of 87 in Mexico City, from complications of stomach cancer. His body was buried at the Panteón Francés in the Deportiva Pensil neighborhood of Mexico City.

== Career ==
Reyes Meza's career began in the theater while still a student, spanning over twenty-five years, although he also continued to paint and fight bulls. In the 1950s he collaborated on scenery with the Ballet de la Academia de la Danza Mexicana (1952–1956), worked on scenery for the Teatro Clásico de México (1952–1960) and Locura Santa theater company (1955–1959), while named production chief of the UNAM ballet in 1954 and a member of the Technical and Artistic Council of Dance in 1956. His career continued into the 1960s as senior set designer for the Enrique Rambla Company (1958–1966) and the set and costume designer for the CAN-CAN Theaters from 1958 to 1968. In 1970 the Union of Stagehands, Electricians, Set Designers, Prop and Theater Workers awarded him a diploma for his work.

Although he remained active in theater in the 1970s, at this time his painting began to overtake his other activities. He began painting murals in the 1950s starting with several large murals for the Casino de la Selva in Cuernavaca from 1952 to 1964 (later controversially destroyed in 2001) and another for the Central de Refrigeración de México in 1955. In the 1960s, he created a sculpted mural with sculptor Federico Canessi on the Nezahualcoyotl Dam in Malpaso Chiapas in 1964, a Venetian style mosaic murals for the Pan American National Bank in Los Angeles (1965–1966), two more for the Autonomous University of Tamaulipas in Tampico in 1967, a mural for the Museo Nacional de Historia (Chapultepec Castle) called Triunfo de la República, along with portraits of Emiliano Zapata and Francisco Mujica in 1968 and a mural for the main headquarters of the Benavides pharmacy chain in Monterrey in 1969. In the 1970s, the created a mural for the Registro Público de la Propiedad y el Comercio in Tlalnepantla in 1971, a mural for the Comisión de Fruticultura in Mexico City in 1974 (since disappeared), various murals for the Centro de Investigaciones Agropecuarios of the State of Mexico from 1977 to 1980, and one other for the Registro Público de la Propiedad y el Comerico in Mexico City in 1978. In 1986 he created another mural for Benavides and in 2004 he created a small Venetian mosaic for the entrance to the crypts at the Santa María de los Apóstoles Church in Mexico City. In 1959, he painted Yolanda Varela's portrait during the production of the film Isla para Dos. In 1958, Reyes Meza made his name as a painter after three shows at the Galería de Arte Mexicano in Mexico City in 1950. Since then, his work has appeared in individual and collective exhibitions in both Mexico and abroad. Major individual exhibitions include the Salón de la Plástica Mexciana (1961), the Galería Baz Fisher in San Miguel Allende (1961), Galería de Arte, A.C. (1963, 1969, 1975, 1976, 1978, 1985), with the Instituto Internacional de Cultura de Relaciones Exteriores in San Antonio, Texas (1963), the Javier Garza Sepulveda home in Garza García, Nuevo León (1975), the Casino de Monterrey (1975), the Casa de Cultura in Monterrey (1980), Instituto de Alergología Maximiliano Ruiz Castañeda in Acambay, State of Mexico (1992), Expo Flor 93 in Huixquilucan, State of Mexico (1993), Club Campestre in Monterrey (1993), ISSSTE in Mexico City (1999), Centro Internacional de Acapulco (1999), Registro Público de la Propiedad y del Comerico in Mexico City (2000), ISSSTE in Tepic, Nayarit (2000), Festival Intercontinental de Teatro del Mundo in Tamaulipas (2001), Centro Médico XXI (2003), with the Cultura Fronteriza in Nuevo Laredo (2005), Reyes Meza Art Museum in Nuevo Laredo (2005, 2011) and the Festival Internacional Tamaulipas (2009).

The artist's work can be found in public and private collections principally in Mexico and the United States. Institutions with his work include Museo Nacional de Historiqa, the Mexican Senate, the Instituto Politécnico Nacional, the Secretaría de Comunicaciones y Transportes, the Registro Público de la Propiedad y el Comercio in Mexico City and in the State of Mexico, the Phoenix Art Museum and Alfa de Monterrey.

Reyes Meza was involved in the formation of a number of organizations related to art and culture in Mexico, starting as a founding member of the Salón de la Plástica Mexicana in 1949. Later he helped to found the Asociación Mexicana de Artes Plásticas (AMAPAC), the Unión de Pintores y Grabadores de México in 1959, Sociedad de Autores de Interés Público in 1976, and the Cultura Fronteriza association in 1992 to promote Mexican art and culture on the country's northern and southern borders.

His other artistic activities included illustration, the decoration of churches, research and design. From 1963 to 1973 he was an illustrator for the El Día newspaper. In 1993 he created illustration for the book La cocina regional de México published by Bancomer. In 1999 he created the illustrations for the book Animales del mundo en los proverbios. Work for churches includes stained glass windows for the Our Lady of Guadalupe Church in Madrid in 1965, a mural and decorative items of the Our Lady of Guadalupe Church in the Rosedal neighborhood of Mexico City in 1980, paintings for the crypts at the San Antonio de Padua Church in Xotepingo, Mexico City in 1986, glass windows, an altar and tapestries for the La Lupita Church in Colonia Ajusco in Coyoacán in 1987, paintings and decorative items for the San Pablito Church on Avenida División del Norte in Tlalpan, Mexico City in 1987 and from 1992 to 1993 he created the decorative tiles for the bell tower of the San Antonio de Padua Church in Xotepingo, Mexico City. In 1988, he published a book called Signos Sagrados about the aesthetics and mathematics of Da Vinci's Vitruvian Man. The work was republished in 2010 as El Círculo Mágico y el Alma del Mundo. Reyes Meza also created the seal for the Universidad Autónoma de Baja California in 1967.

Reyes Meza's first award for his artistic work was a critics’ award for best set design in 1957 for his work on Bodas de Sangre by Federico García Lorca at UNAM. This was followed by the José María Luis Mora Award from the State of Mexico in 1989, and a tribute by the Casino de la Selva in Cuernavaca the same year. In 1990 the Museo de Bellas Artes in Toluca held a retrospective. In 1991 he received the Cecilio A. Robelo Award for his career, followed in 1993 with the Presea Estatal de Cultura prize from the state of Tamaulipas. In 1994, the Secretaría de Educación Pública published a book with reproductions of his works. In 2001 he was awarded a medal as one of the founders of the Salón de la Plástica Mexicana and for his career as an artist. In 2002 the Universidad de Baja California held a tribute to him. In 2008, the city of Nuevo Laredo named its art museum after him.

== Artistry ==
José Reyes Meza's work has been classified as part of the Mexican muralism movement, but this has been disputed. His iconography, especially in his earlier work, is similar to that of Muralism's Diego Rivera, Guillermo Meza, Julio Castellanos and Jesús Guerrero Galván, with Reyes Meza's concept of “Mexicanness” tied to the life of the common people. He spent a good part of his career working on murals, which show his aptitude for mathematics, used to create harmony in his compositions.

However, in his later work, he looked for new hypotheses, by 1961, influence from the work of Van Gogh became evident with sunflowers in one series. He also worked to revive still life painting in Mexico.

Reyes stated that “Ever since I began to paint, my work has reflected all my experiences.” One of these is music, which shows in his canvas through his brushstrokes and use of color.
