= Mario Orozco Rivera =

Mexican muralist and painter

Mario Orozco Rivera (January 19, 1930 – November 20, 1998) was a Mexican muralist and painter, a later proponent of Mexican muralism, and whose work was particularly influenced by David Alfaro Siqueiros. He created a number of murals, mostly in the state of Veracruz before becoming an assistant to Siqueiros, directing the Taller Siqueiros in Cuernavaca and working with the artists on projects such as the Polyforum Cultural Siqueiros. While preferring mural work, which he considered less commercial, Orozco Rivera also created oils and sculptures. Many of these works were exhibited in Mexico and abroad and can be found in many major collections. His work received recognition in various countries.

== Life ==
Orozco Rivera was born in Mexico City to a circus family, in which he performed as a young child. When asked about his famous last names, he used to state “(José Clemente) Orozco is my dad and (Diego) Rivera is my mom!" Orozco's son, Gabriel Orozco, has stated that his father is not related to either artist.

At age sixteen he went to Cuba but returned after the Batista coup to begin studying at the Escuela Nacional de Pintura, Escultura y Grabado "La Esmeralda" in 1952. After he finished, he traveled in Europe and into the then Soviet Union and China, paying for it by singing political songs. Like other artists of the Mexican muralism movement, he was politically active, a member for thirty years of the Mexican Communist Party then of the Unified Socialist Party of Mexico. This also mixed with his artistic work, working with political artist groups such as the Frente Nacional de Artes Plásticas and the Sociedad de Profesores e Investigadores, both of the Universidad Veracruzana.

While primarily a painter, he was also a poet, composer and musician, as well as a promoter of art and literature. From the 1960s to the 1980s he composed political songs and recorded four albums in the Soviet Union.

However, he remained primarily a painter calling painting a “most jealous lover” remaining active in the craft until his death despite poor health. Orozco Rivera died at age 68 from cardio-respiratory failure, leaving behind his third wife, Ema León de Orozco and five children, Paloma, Valentín, Gabriel, Alejandra and Bruno.

== Career ==
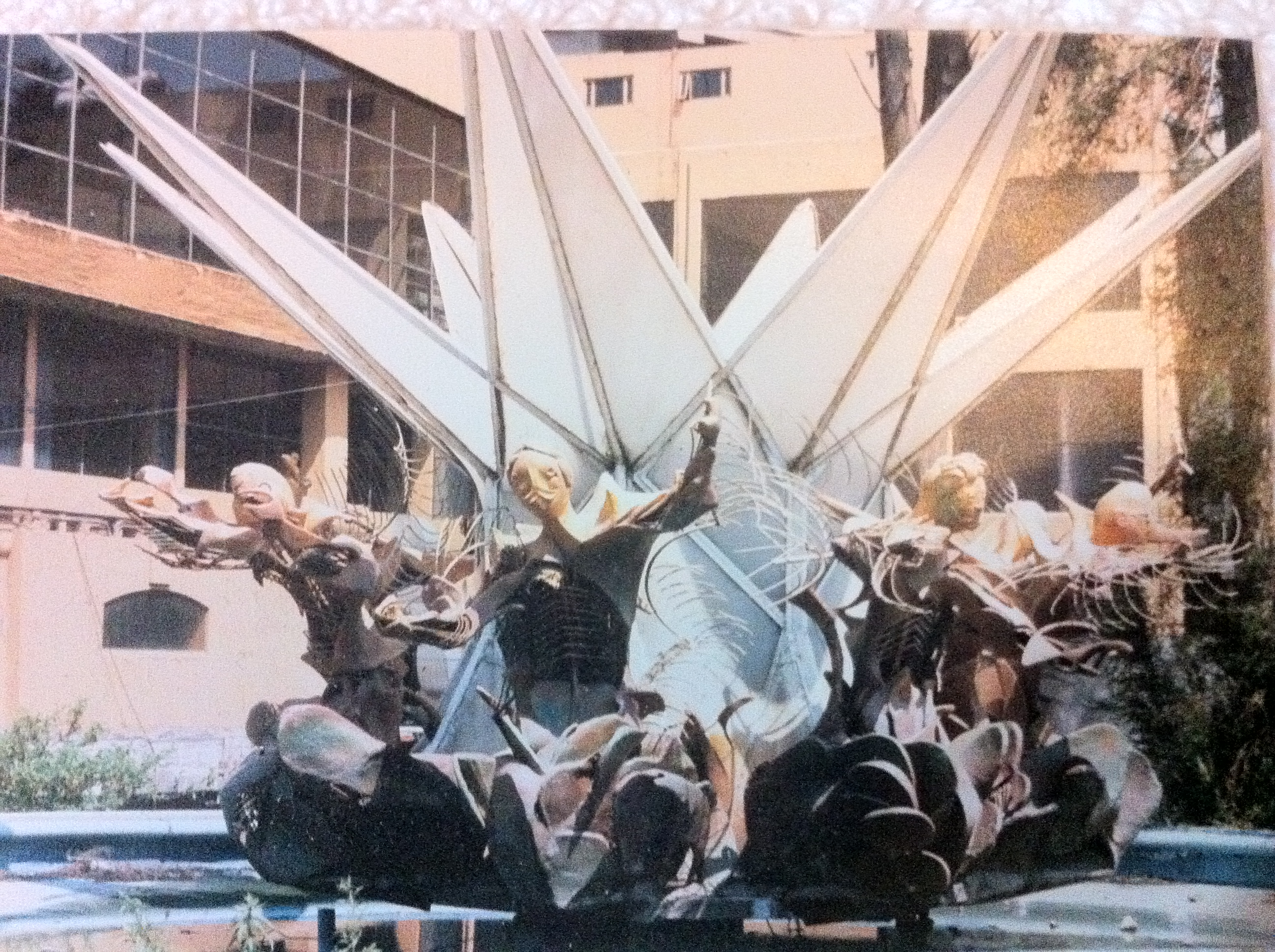
Monumental sculpture by the artist

Most of Orozco Rivera’s career was dedicated to mural painting, on his own and working with David Alfaro Siqueiros. He painted his first mural in 1958 at the auditorium of the Museo de Antropología in Xalapa, Veracruz, followed by various mural works for the Universidad Veracruzana in the late 1950s and early 1960s at the veterinary school, the stairwell of the main library and other locations. Other murals he created include those at the Banco Regional del Pacífico in Culiacán, Sinaloa, the Tribunal de Justicia of the state of Veracruz, and the Benemérita Universidad Autónoma de Puebla. He dedicated a large part of his career to teaching, starting at the Universidad Veracruzana. In 1964, he became an assistant to Siqueiros, eventually becoming the director of the Taller Siqueiros in Cuernavaca, collaborating with Siqueiros and training Mexican and foreign artists. He and various students from this institution worked on the murals at the Polyforum Cultural Siqueiros. Orozco Rivera also worked with Siqueiros on the mural for the Museo Nacional de Historia. Other monumental works included sculpture, such as the fountains for the Hotel de México and another for the Hotel Casino Selva in Cuernavaca.

He also worked with artist and cultural organizations such as the Centro Libre de Experimentación Teatral and the Salón de la Plástica Mexicana. He was also a regular contributor to the Fundación Cultural Pascual.

Orozco Rivera did easel work as well with his first individual exhibition at the El Círculo de Bellas Artes Gallery. Since then he exhibited his work in numerous individual and collective shows in Mexico and abroad including venues such as the Museo de Arte Moderno, the Tecnológico de al Comisión Federal de Electricidad, Iconográfico de Quijote in Guanajuato, the National Museum in Prague and a major individual exhibition at the Palacio de Bellas Artes in 1960. Orozco Rivera’s works can be found in major museum collections in Mexico, Venezuela, Argentina, the United States, the Czech Republic, Italy, England and China, in institutions such as the Casa de las Américas in Havana. The Polyforum Cultural Siqueiros has a collection of about 300 of his pieces.

In 1956 and 1957 Orozco Rivera won the acquisition prize of the Nuevos Valores event of the Salón de la Plástica Mexicana. He won third place at the International Painting Competition in the Soviet Union in 1957. He also received recognitions for his work from the governments of Bulgaria, France and Czechoslovakia. After his death the Foro Cultural Coyoacanense and the Polyforum Cultural Siquieros held retrospectives and tributes to his work.

== Artistry ==
Orozco Rivera was a student and apprentice to David Alfaro Siqueiros, a later proponent of the Mexican muralism movement, faithfully adhering to the aesthetics and ideology of social realism. His artistic work; oils, sculptures and murals show strong influence from Siqueiros, with the most common themes being the struggles of common and marginalized peoples, done without portraying anyone in particular, using composite faces. He considered painting to be a social contract and preferred painting murals over easel works “which are sold in galleries like merchandise.” He did not believe in art for its own sake, rather that it was fundamentally social and communicative. He stated he painted to express what he had inside, not for pleasure.
