= Francisco Icaza =

Mexican artist known for travels and paintings (1930–2014)

- Born: Francisco Icaza González; October 5, 1930; Mexican Embassy, El Salvador
- Died: May 3, 2014 (aged 83); Mexico City, Mexico
- Known for: Painting, drawing
- Movement: Generación de la Ruptura
- Spouses: Concepción Solana Morales; Tony Marcín

Francisco Icaza (5 October 1930 – 3 May 2014) was a Mexican artist best known for his drawings about his travels and his oil paintings. He spent much of his life living in and visiting various countries around the world. He began painting as a child while living as a refugee in the Mexican embassy in Germany. Icaza exhibited his work both in Mexico and abroad in Europe, South America, the Middle East, Asia and India, most notably at his three major solo exhibitions at the Museo de Arte Moderno in Mexico City. He also painted a mural dedicated to Bertolt Brecht, La Farándula, at the Casino de la Selva in Cuernavaca, a focus of controversy when the work was moved and restored in the early 2000s. He painted additional murals for the Mexican Pavilion at the HemisFair in Texas (Urban Flowers); for the Mexican Pavilion at Expo 67 in Montreal, Canada (Canto al Barroco Maya); and for the Mexican Pavilion in Osaka (Repressive Computers) at Expo '70. This last mural is held at the Museo de Arte Abstracto Manuel Felguérez in Zacatecas City. He was an active member of the Salón de la Plástica Mexicana and also a member and founder of several important Mexican artistic movements including Los Interioristas (Nueva Presencia), El Salón Independiente, and La Confrontación 66.

== Early life ==
Icaza was born in the Mexican embassy in San Salvador on 5 October 1930, the son of a well known diplomat. Much of his childhood was spent in Germany during the rise of the Nazis. As he spent much time alone as a child, he began painting. His youth was very nomadic, as his family travelled to countries in Europe, Asia, the Middle East and America.

A stay in Madrid exposed Icaza to the works of European masters. After a year of studying political science at the University of Leuven, he decided to study painting at the Brussels Academy of Fine Arts. In 1951, he moved to New York at the invitation of the Mexican painter Rufino Tamayo, whom he studied with. While in New York, Icaza also worked as a photography director. At the age of 25, he returned to Mexico and married Concepción Solana Morales. They had five children: Francisco, Miguel, Pablo, Concha and Teresa. In his early years in Mexico City, he continued studying the art of painting under Antonio Rodríguez Luna, and considered him to be one of his primary teachers.

From the 1950s to 1968 Icaza remained in Mexico, but the political turmoil following the Tlatelolco massacre caused him to leave Mexico again, not returning permanently until 1990. During that time he lived or spent time in the United States, Guatemala, Colombia, Spain and the United Kingdom.

== Career ==
Icaza began his career in 1947 with his first teacher, an Armenian painter and refugee, at the Mediterranean coast in Lebanon, where Icaza swore before the Olympic gods that the rest of his life would be dedicated to painting. In 1961, Icaza founded an artist group called Los Interioristas or Nueva Presencia with painter Arnold Belkin. In 1968, he formed the Salón Independiente along with Vicente Rojo Almazán and Manuel Felguérez.

In his life, Icaza worked in many mediums and formats. Icaza painted a mural at the Casino de la Selva for the theater renovated by the architect Félix Candela. The mural, La Farándula was dedicated to Bertolt Brecht as an apology for the world of clowns and actors, inspired by The Threepenny Opera. Other murals created by Icaza include: Computadoras Represoras, for the Mexican Pavilion at Osaka, Japan; Canto al Barroco Maya, for the Mexican Pavilion at Montreal Canadá; and Urban Flowers for the Mexican Pavilion at Hemisfair in Houston, Texas. Icaza also created a monumental sculpture dedicated to the muralist painter José Clemente Orozco. Icaza was a prolific easel oil painter and a prolific drawer with ink, gouache and water color. Icaza also published several books, including La Fiera Malvada (1971), Me quiero ir al mar (1985), and Llegando a puerto en sentido contrario.

Icaza rejected the commercialization of art but admitted that an artist needs to live from his work, taking advantage of different opportunities. Despite his strong criticism of the Mexican government during his life, he felt no contradiction in taking grants from official sources, saying that the arts of a country are always their best things to show to the world, and he is part of that. His government affiliations have included a position as a cultural attaché for the Mexican embassy in Colombia . In 1993, he received a special grant from CONACULTA to return to Mexico and paint in oils full-time, after his work on drawings that expressed his wishes to "leave by the sea" (Me quiero ir al mar).

Icaza's work has been exhibited in various venues in Mexico and abroad. Major exhibitions during his lifetime include the Museo de Arte Moderno (1979, 1981 and 1998), the Phoenix Art Museum and the Museum of Contemporary Art San Diego. In 2011, he had an exhibition at the Galería Machado in Mexico City, sponsored by CONACULTA. The Museo de Arte Moderno holds several of Icaza's works.

Icaza was a member of the Salón de la Plástica Mexicana and an active member of Salón Independiente and the movement Confrontación 66.

== Later life and death ==
In the early 2000s, Icaza was involved in a controversy related to his mural installed at the Casino de la Selva in Cuernavaca. In 2001, the Costco group bought the former casino to build new facilities, a move whose validity Icaza questioned. He protested the sale and the plan to restore his and other murals. The project went ahead, but the artists were not permitted to see the restoration work. After the murals were shown to the public in their new location in 2004, Icaza and other artists denounced the works as copies or fakes, claiming the originals were destroyed.

He was married to Tony Marcín for 24 years and lived in Mexico until his death.

Icaza died at the age of 83 in Mexico City on the afternoon of 3 May 2014.

== Artistry ==
Icaza has been classified as part of the Generación de la Ruptura, the art movement that followed Mexican muralism. He had social content in his work, that reflected his socialist ideals, much like the muralists; however his painting was not a communication with the masses.

He experimented with a wide range of themes and techniques. His production had marked periods, from neo figuration to criticism and from there to works that recall the ancient cultures as humorous and satirical recurrences. Following the line of the Interiorists, he painted self-portraits revelatory of his own state of mind. He produced a series of oil paintings and drawings of prostitutes and the Lumpenproletariat that shows influence from German Expressionism and symbolist painter James Ensor. The artist states that while he has changed styles and techniques, elements of expressionism remain constant in his work, stating "When I draw I try to transmit my obsessions as a thinking being, as a vital part of the 20th century; my usual themes are life and death."

Icaza produced gouaches, engravings and drawings conceived in book form such as La fiera malvada, Animales míticos, Breve historia de una mano juguetona, El viaje erótico, Sancho escuchando la lectura del Quijote, Me quiero ir al Mar and Llegando a puerto en sentido contrario. The images here were not conceived as illustrations for texts rather he invented arguments and used a language of ideographs with have a similarity to symbolism and surrealism.

The artist spoke multiple languages and was a devout reader of Albert Camus. He was a friend of Ray Bradbury and Aldous Huxley and admirer of José Clemente Orozco, all of whom affected his work, as well as his political ideas, which were strongly socialist and did not change over his life. Icaza was well-versed in contemporary and past artistic movements, and also had ample knowledge of ancient cultures and the literatures of various countries and epochs. The artist stated he was fascinated by codices and other historical works that take advantage of signs and images to convey their meaning.

== Legacy ==
In 2019, a retrospective exhibition of 145 of Icaza's works was presented by the Museo del Palacio de Bellas Artes in Mexico City, titled "Francisco Icaza: me quiero ir al mar."
