= Polyforum Cultural Siqueiros =

Building in Mexico City, Mexico

Coordinates: 19.39323°N 99.17343°W

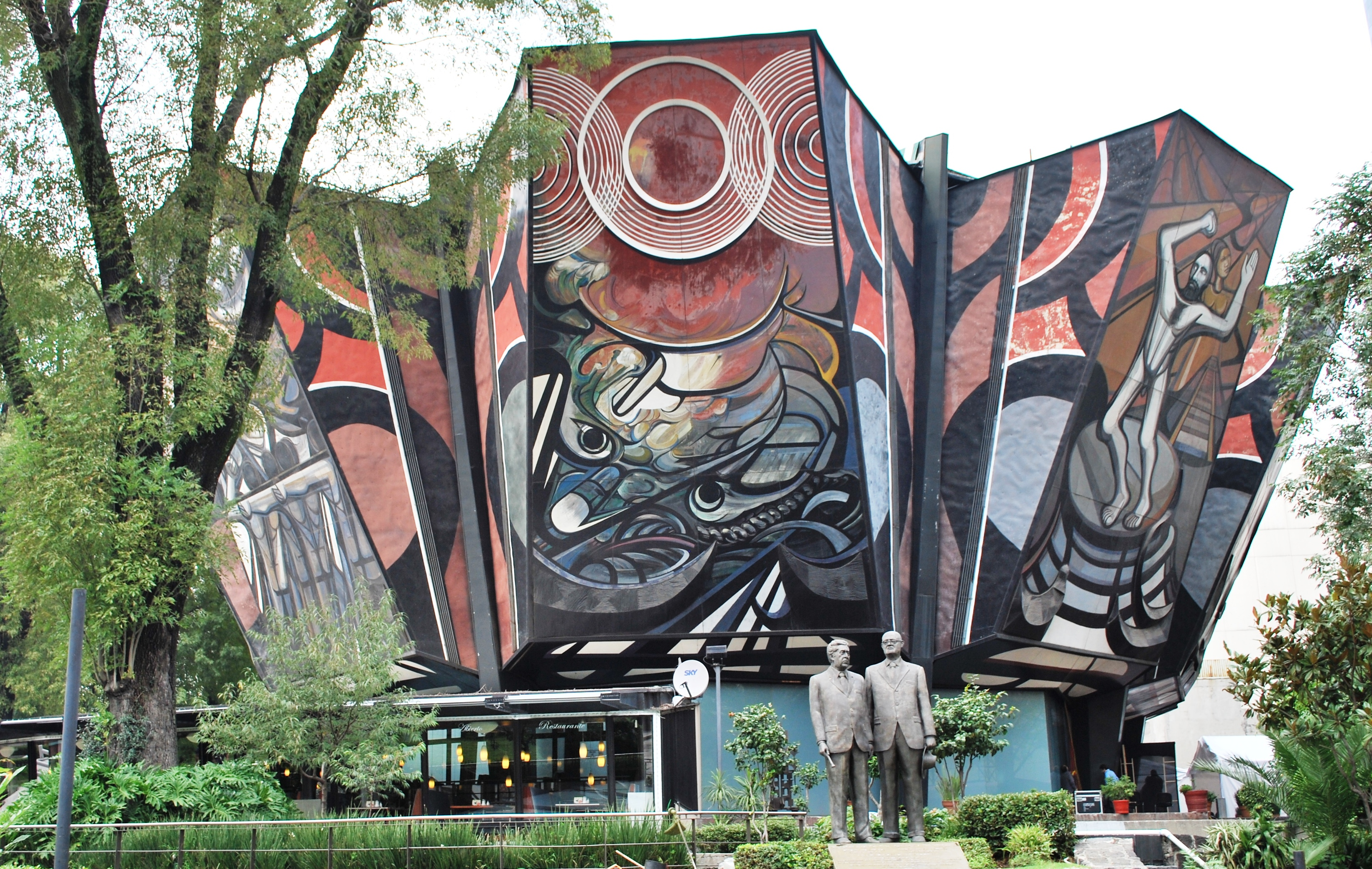
View of the Polyforum

The Siqueiros Cultural Polyforum is a cultural, political and social facility located in Mexico City as part of the World Trade Center Mexico City. It was designed and decorated by David Alfaro Siqueiros in the 1960s and hosts the largest mural work in the world called La Marcha de la Humanidad. The building has a theatre, galleries and more, but the main focus is the Forum Universal, which contains the interior portion of Siqueiros' mural work. Visitors can experience the mural while standing on a rotating stage, listening to Siqueiros narrate.

== Site ==
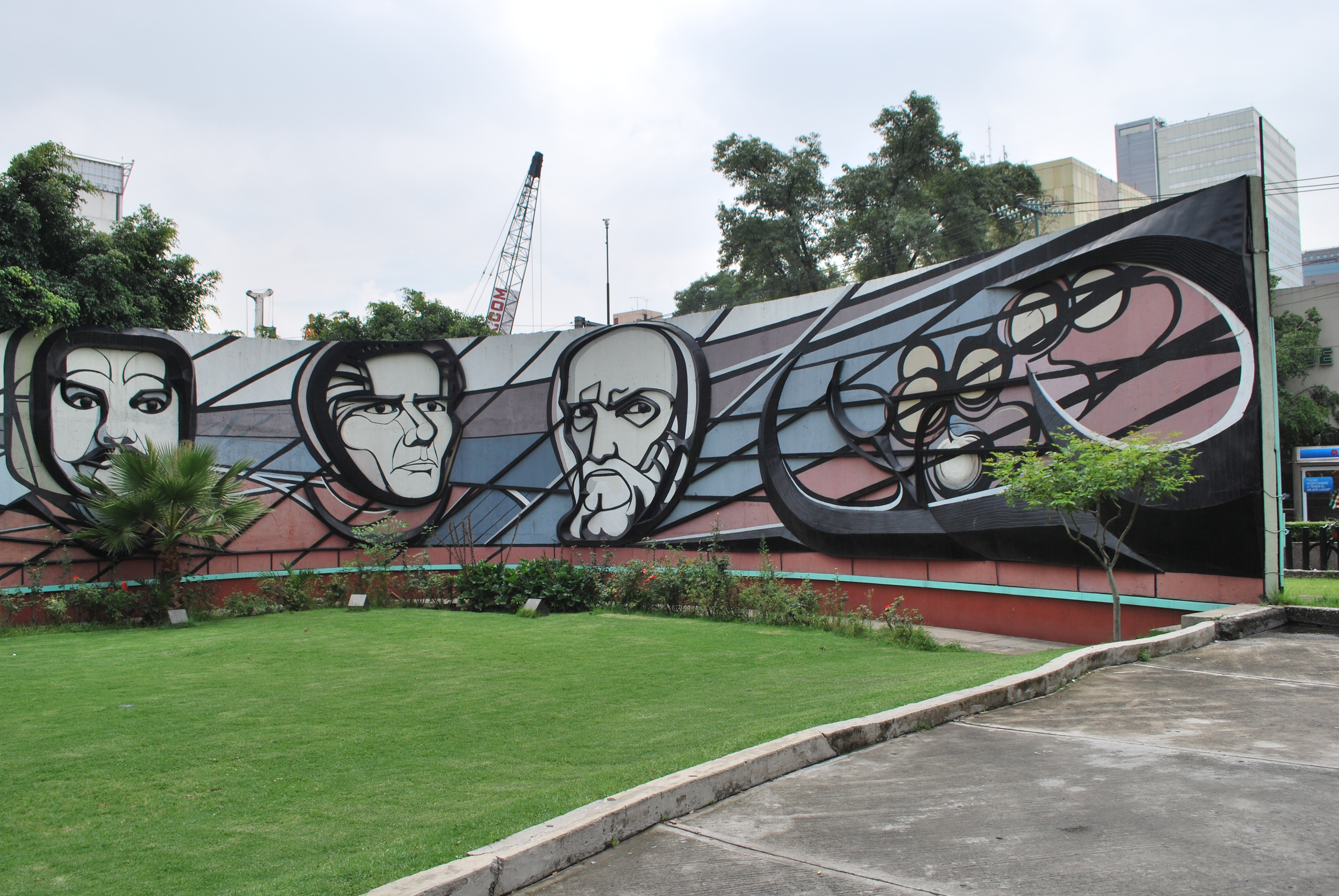
View of the outer wall of the facility

The Polyforum is a decagon shaped construction with different exhibition spaces that feature David Alfaro Siqueiros' work. The building is part of a business complex called the World Trade Center Mexico City in the Benito Juárez borough of Mexico City. This complex was designed by architects Joaquín Alvarez, Guillermo Rossel de la Lama and Ramón Mikelajáuregui, and built just outside Parque de la Lama, but the Polyforum was designed and decorated by Siqueiros, who nicknamed it "El coronelazo." The exterior is in the form of a diamond and the inside has eight sides. The building with its murals is considered to be an "artistic heritage site" for Mexico, registered by the Centro Nacional de Conservación, Instituto Nacional de Bellas Artes y Literatura and Registro del Patrimonio Artístico Mueble. The Polyforum is a multiple event facility dedicated to cultural, political and social events. Its main aspects include a 500-seat theatre, two galleries, offices and the Foro Universal or Universal Forum.

The outside wall was built in 1970 as a way for patron Manuel Suárez to prevent encroachment or destruction of his property. The wall became immediately controversial because although it was built for safety purposes, it obstructed the view of the Polyforum for passersby, thus making it less accessible to the general public. The press allegedly deemed the wall defensive and antisocial, and Siqueiros tried to defend the wall by saying that it was merely an aesthetic extension of the Polyforum itself. Made into a work of art, the inner surface of the wall celebrates the fiftieth anniversary of the Mexican mural movement of which Siqueiros actively participated in with Diego Rivera, José Clemente Orozco, and others. The mural prominently features portraits of Rivera and Orozco, as well as Dr. Atl, a key figure in the start of the mural movement, and graphic artists Guadalupe Posada and Leopoldo Mendez.

The Polyforum's exterior, a 2,750 ft. area, features a twelve-faced sculptural mural painting. Each face depicts a different symbolic concept. The twelve concepts depicted are: Destiny, Ecology, Acrobats, Masses, Decalog, Christ, Indigenous Peoples, Dance, Mythology, Mingling of Races, Music, and Atom. The exterior work is meant to serve as a preview of the interior mural, to entice visitors to enter the building, and to make visitors contemplate the complex meanings of the concepts represented.

== Political climate ==
The year 1960 marked the fiftieth year of the Mexican Revolution, and the political situation in Mexico during the 1960s was quite grim. The early 1960s was marked by major control by the Left and attempts to create class equality, but these attempts unfortunately failed. In 1964, the combination of both an economic decline and an announcement that allottable land was near exhaustion led many peasants to revolt. In the late 1960s, the Right gained control, which led to many doctor and student strikes that were received with strong resistance from the government. The most shocking example of the murky political situation in 1960s Mexico happened in the form of the Tlatelolco Massacre on October 2, 1968. During a student demonstration that happened ten days before the Summer Olympics in Mexico City, police and military officers shot into a crowd of unarmed students at Tlatelolco Plaza. The final death toll remains a mystery, but it has been reported that four students died, twenty were wounded, and thousands were beaten, jailed, and disappeared. This event coincided with the intended opening of the Polyforum Cultural Siqueiros during the summer of 1968, and demonstrates how turbulent the political climate was in Mexico during the Polyforum's construction.

== Mexico 2000 ==
The Polyforum was designed as part of a major redevelopment/improvement project for Mexico City entitled Mexico 2000. Because of an increase in Mexico City's urban population, Mexico 2000 strived to generate income for the city through tourism and services at its decentralized location at Parque de la Lama. In addition to making arts more accessible to people through Siqueiros’ work at the Polyforum, some of the other contributions of Mexico 2000 included underground networks of driveways, closed circuit radio and television broadcasting, a new system of construction called “Tridilosa” that lightened the weight of the building structure as to allow for more rooms to be created, and expedited travel services for tourists coming into the city.
The plaza's major hotel, “El Hotel de Mexico,” is 730 foot high building that was designed to house a large number of tourists. At the time, the hotel was the tallest reinforced concrete and earthquake-resistant building in the world, and featured 1,512 rooms and suites with a variety of dining options. Equally important to tourism as the Polyforum, “El Hotel de Mexico” was built for both functionality and aesthetic pleasure through its architectural grandeur.

== The commission ==
Although the date is rather uncertain, most agree that the initial commission of the Polyforum happened in 1960 before the radical artist Siqueiros was imprisoned for the charges of attacking police, resisting arrest, firing an illegal weapon, and inciting violence. Siqueiros officially accepted the commission from art patron and industrialist Manuel Suárez on September 7, 1964. The first request of Suárez was for a large mural to be housed in Cuernavaca. The location of the mural was then moved to Mexico City in 1966, and now is known as The March of Humanity. The location change to Parque de la Lama was part of Suárez's larger ideas to both draw people away from the urban center and to promote tourism in an effort to boost the suffering Mexican economy.

Creating the Polyforum was a collective act, and required a large team of workers. Several architects, engineers, painters, sculptors, and acoustics experts from all around the world came to work on the massive project. The undertaking was so large that Siqueiros purchased an additional piece of land next to his home and studio in Cuernavaca for his team to complete the project. All of the panels for The March of Humanity were created in Cuernavaca, where Rhode Island School of Design alumni Mark Rogovin worked under Siqueiros. Rogovin attests to the fact that he and a friend were the only U.S. natives to be working on the project, as most of the other members were from Japan, Italy, Argentina, and various other locations around the world. According to Rogovin, Siqueiros was constantly at the studio, putting in long days and making sure that the project was being carried out to his standard. The project was initially to be completed for the 1968 Olympic Games, but due to political and financial complications, the Polyforum was not finished and inaugurated until December 15, 1971.

== Forum Universal ==
The main feature of the complex at Parque de la Lama is the Forum Universal, which contains Siquieros’ mural called La Marcha de la Humanidad (The March of Humanity). The building, which contains four floors and has an area of 134,000 square feet, also contains a theatre, two joined galleries and other facilities. Siqueiros’ mural covers the dome on the top floor, and up to one thousand spectators can stand on the rotating platform beneath the mural. Accompanying the viewing experience, a light and sound program that was designed by Manuel Suárez y Suárez plays to educate the viewers about the mural. The next floor down features a space for local and international art exhibitions. Below this floor is a theater that features various performances, as well as a small shopping area called the Universal Forum Emerging Art Space (EAE). The basement of the Polyforum is an open space that can be used for storage as well as exhibitions.

In 2011, for the 40th anniversary of the structure, the Forum's two art galleries named after Dr. Atl and Mario Orozco Rivera were renovated and merged into one gallery, measuring over 300 square meters. The first served as the site museum with a space of 145 meters squared. Its permanent exhibition consisted of photographs and models and sketches related to the painting of the site's mural. It also contained biographical information in the form of documents and photographs of Manuel Suárez y Suárez, the sponsor of the Polyforum along with that of Siqueiros. The gallery contains a statue of Manuel Suárez y Suárez. The second gallery dedicated to Orozco Rivera measured 169 meters squared and is shows mainly temporary exhibits of painting, sculpture and photography. The new gallery's first exhibition of 2011 was called “My Trend Week," and it was designed to display the works of new artistic talent in architecture as well as graphic, industrial and interior design. The combined space has been tentatively renamed “Espacio de Arte Emergente” (Emerging Art Space) .

== La Marcha de la Humanidad (The March of Humanity) ==
Inside the Polyforum hosts Siqueiros’ largest mural ever to be created, which is fully titled, The March of Humanity on Earth and Toward the Cosmos: Misery and Science. Including the exterior panels, the mural measures 8,700 square meters. Siqueiros described the theme as “Naked people close to the soil, a woman with a child on her lap, and smaller children raising their arms begging for bread. They are hungry, the oldest, doubled over under a bundle of firewood, walks off in search of a livelihood; groups of women running pell-mell knock each other to get a crumb of bread thrown away by others---an unending struggle to solve the basic problem of existence.” The overall theme of the mural is humanity's endless struggle throughout history and the search for a better society. The mural is divided into four main sections: The March of Humanity Towards Bourgeois Democratic Revolution; The March of Humanity to the Revolution of the Future; Peace, Culture, and Harmony; and Science and Technology.

=== Section One: South Wall: The March of Humanity Towards Bourgeois Democratic Revolution ===
This section of the mural depicts a revolution before a time of democratic revolution and is characterized by violence and confusion. There are many figures and forms in different positions, suggesting overall chaos. In the center, demagoguery emerges in the form of a clown who is flanked by militaristic figures. Ninety-some figures are pictured in this scene and are compositionally stacked rather than overlapped. The upper register tells a story that begins with two dark-skinned, half-naked men shown with their knees bent. Next to them, two mothers and their several children walking through a barren landscape that features one large, tree-like form in the background. The next figure is an old man who is bent down under a pile of sticks. Next to him is a group of women huddling together who are shown covering their children with shawls. This entire group is shown to be moving toward a white-faced, dancing figure with his arms raised. This figure, who appears as a leader of some sort, is flanked by a group of people who are also raising their arms. The lower register features figures that are larger in scale than those in the upper register. The first form is an abstract, humanoid form that is more difficult to recognize than the figures from the upper register. Following him is a brutalized, black male figure who is shown armless and hanged, swinging from a noose. The next figures are two large, monstrous figures with recognizably human anatomy that are followed by a larger group of marchers that are shown in uniform, carrying spears and rifles. This procession of synchronized marchers closes out the frame.

=== Section Two: North Wall: The March of Humanity to the Revolution of the Future ===
This section depicts the future as a chaotic and confusing time, and begins with a woman being attacked by a ferocious anthropomorphic beast. Next to the woman, a man chops down a poisonous tree, and across from him, two frightened women scurry across the turbulent landscape. Above these figures is a three-dimensional figure that protrudes from the wall and is representative of metamorphosis. The next scene depicts a large grouping of women next to a large amate tree, which is representative of the new leaders who will aid the development of humanity. Two figures come out of the tree, and seem to be flying into space. In the final scene, a gender ambiguous figure, shown sitting on a rock, points back to the tree to emphasize its importance. The landscape of Section 2 is much more rough and jagged than the landscape in Section 1, suggesting that the future revolution will be a great challenge for humanity to overcome.

=== Sections Three and Four: East and West Sides: Peace, Culture, and Harmony ===
This section shows a man offering industrialization to the west, and on the east side, a woman offering culture to humanize society. Converging lines that come out from the wall behind the figures unify the hands of the man and woman. The man in this scene is the leader who emerged from the amate tree in Section 2, and his return with the female suggests that he has successfully mated and created a new race. These two figures have brought the tools necessary to save humanity through starting a new march towards a better future. .

== Siqueiros Foundation of the Arts ==
The Polyforum is a private institution which is supported through its activities and through private donations to the Siqueiros Foundation. The Siqueiros Foundation is run by Siqueiros' niece Anna Siqueiros, based in Los Angeles, and its mission is "Bringing Color into a Concrete World." As a memorial to the deceased David Alfaro Siqueiros, the Siqueiros Foundation strives to empower underprivileged children by providing them with materials and locations to artistically express themselves. In addition, the Siqueiros Foundation preserves a collection of periodicals, audio, video and photography related to the artist, whose digitalization was begun in 2010. This collection consists of 102,908 documents and images with elements such as correspondence with contemporary intellectuals, writers and politicians, including that from the Siquieros was incarcerated in Lecumberri from 1960 to 1964. It also includes 7,000 postcards from Germany alone, and 10,000 photographs of family and 80,000 texts written about the artist.

== History ==
Over its first forty years, the building suffered significant deterioration to its structure and its murals. The deterioration of the mural work is due to environmental factors and the materials Siquieros used to create the piece. In 2011, remodeling work was begun on the facility to mark its fortieth anniversary. Some restoration work had been performed in 2011, but lack of funds has prevented completion.
