= New University Symbol =

Mural by David Alfaro Siqueiros

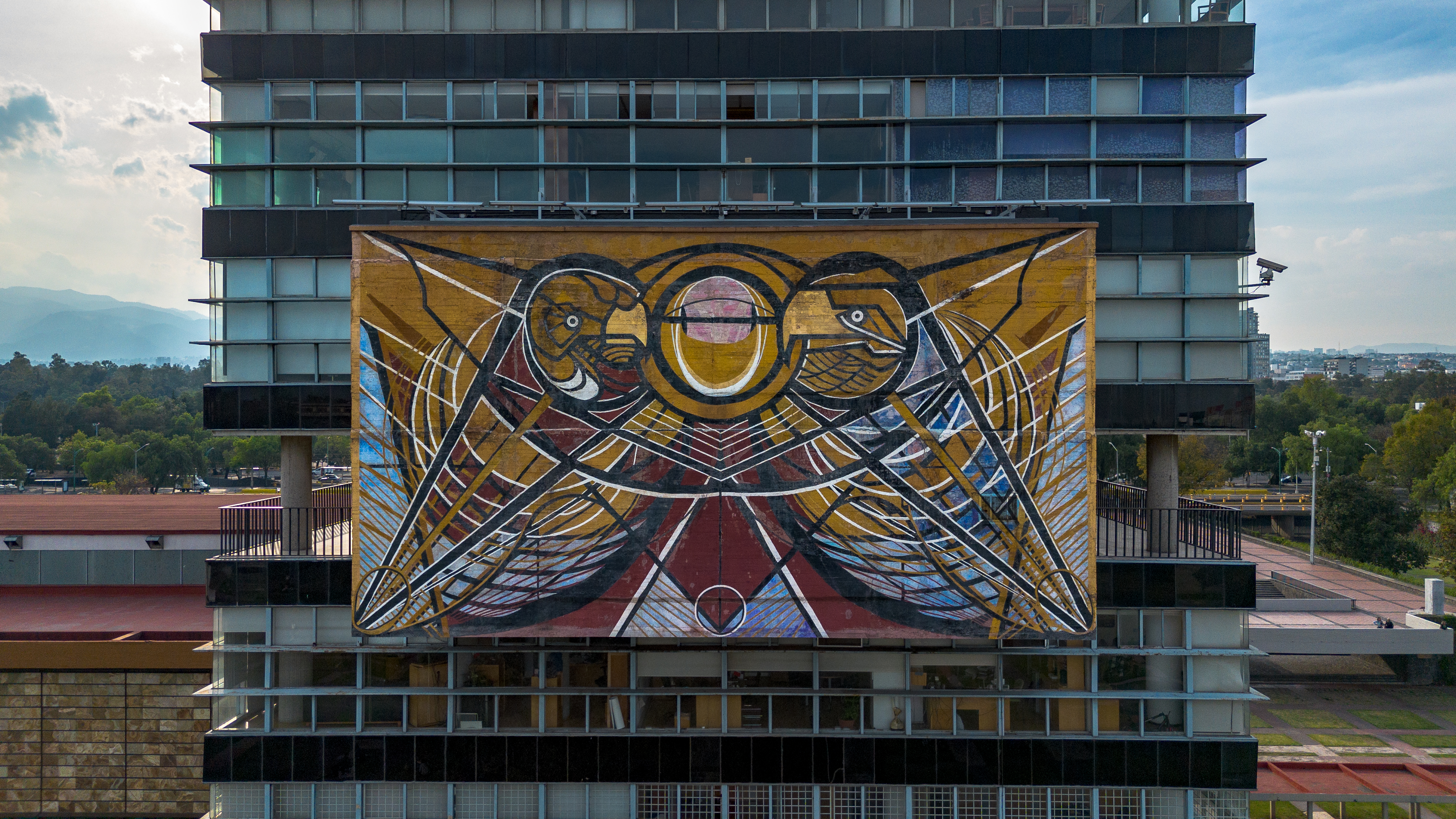
New University Symbol (1952-1956) by David Alfaro Siqueiros

The New University Symbol (Spanish: Nuevo Símbolo Universitario) is a mural created by the Mexican artist David Alfaro Siqueiros, between 1952 and 1956. It is part of a set of three murals located in the Rector's Tower of the National Autonomous University of Mexico (UNAM).

== Description ==
Located on the west wall of the Rector's Office and overlooking the central campus, the mural was painted on a box called a "vierendel", a space without walls, but with windows. In the center of the mural, a linear composition can be seen linking the figures of an eagle and a condor, symbols that refer to the university's coat of arms; the Mexican eagle and the Andean condor represent Latin American unity.
