= Olvera Street =

Historic district in Los Angeles, United States

Coordinates: 34.057495°N 118.237996°W

Olvera Street / Placita Olvera / Calle Olvera
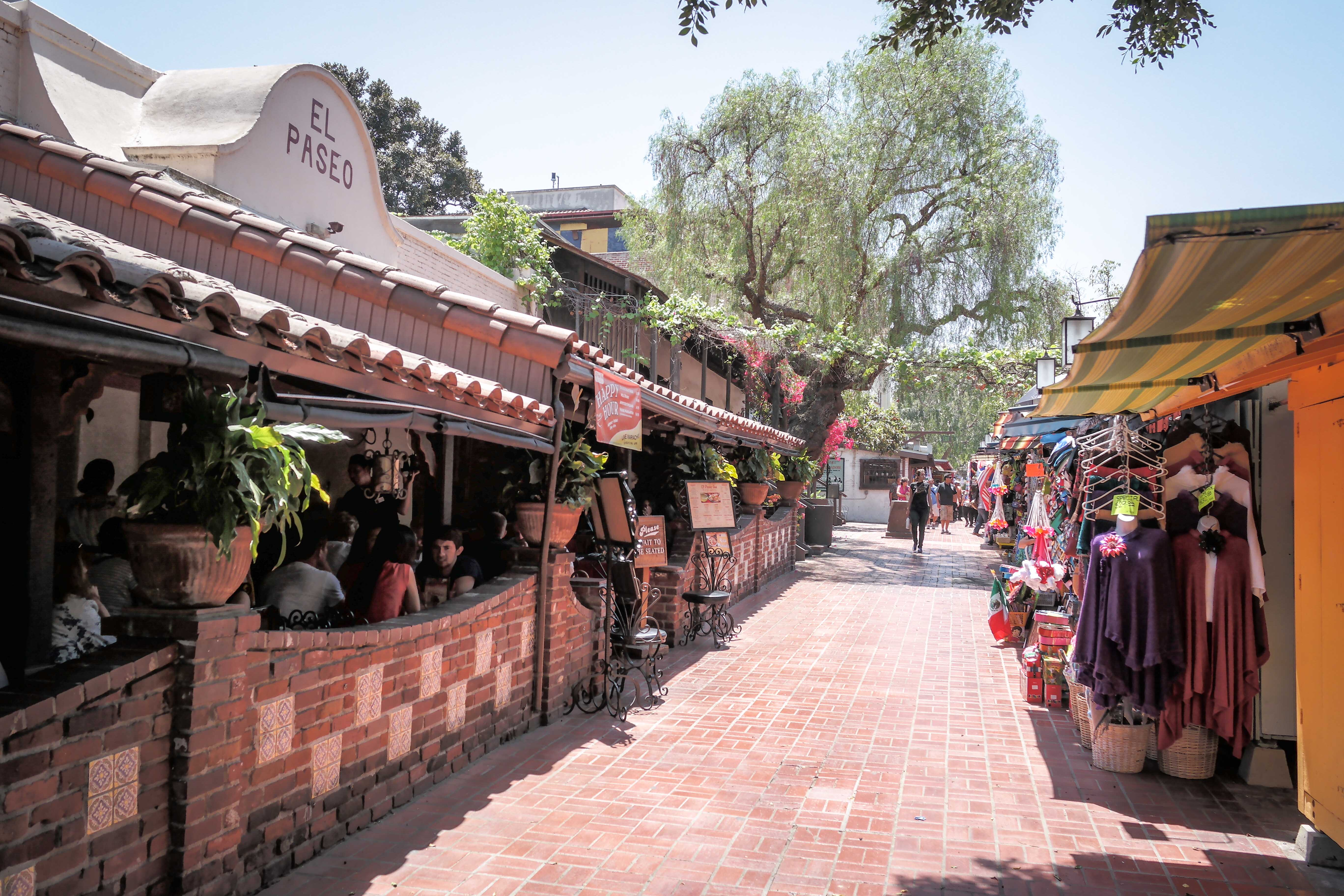
- Interactive map of Olvera Street / Placita Olvera / Calle Olvera
- Area: El Pueblo de Los Ángeles Historical Monument
- Location: Los Angeles, California

Construction
- Construction start: c. 1820

Other
- Website: calleolvera.com

Olvera Street, commonly known by its Spanish names Placita Olvera and Calle Olvera, is a historic pedestrian street in El Pueblo de Los Ángeles, the historic center of Los Angeles, California, United States. The street is located off of the Plaza de Los Ángeles, the oldest plaza in California, which served as the center of the city life through the Spanish and Mexican eras into the early American era, following the Conquest of California.

Restaurants, vendors, and public establishments line the street. Calle Olvera attracted almost two million visitors per year. The street is home to numerous of the oldest buildings in Los Angeles, include the Ávila Adobe, the oldest standing residence in Los Angeles.

== Geography ==
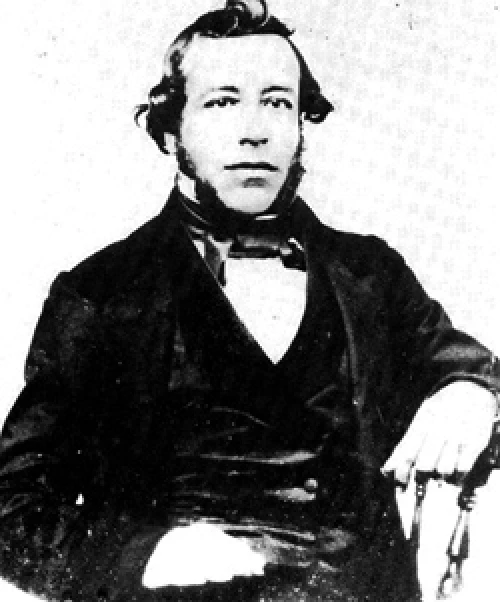
Olvera Street is named after Californio judge and politician Agustín Olvera, who held L.A.'s first county court sessions in his house on the street

Olvera Street is in the northeast of modern-day Downtown Los Angeles, between Main and Alameda streets, running north from the Los Angeles Plaza to Cesar Chavez Avenue. It is part of El Pueblo de Los Ángeles Historical Monument, the area immediately around the Plaza. This is west of Union Station and southeast of Chinatown. Though Los Angeles was founded in 1781, this Plaza dates to the 1820s, and is approximately a block east and south of the original 18th-century Plaza.

== History ==
The street has variously been known as Placita Olvera, Calle de los Vignes, Vine Street, and Wine Street.

=== Early days ===
Los Angeles was founded in 1781 by Spanish pobladores (settlers), on a site southeast of today's Olvera Street near the Los Angeles River. They consisted of 11 families—44 men, women, and children — and were accompanied by a few Spanish soldiers. They had come from nearby Mission San Gabriel Arcángel to establish a secular pueblo on the banks of the Porciúncula River at the Indian village of Yaanga.

Of the 44 original pobladores [colonists] who founded Los Angeles, only two were white, […] Of the other 42, 26 had some degree of African ancestry and 16 were Indians or mestizos [people of mixed Spanish and Indian blood]. — William M. Mason, 1975

The new town was named El Pueblo de Nuestra Señora Reina de los Ángeles. Priests from San Gabriel established an asistencia (a sub-mission), the Nuestra Señora Reina de los Angeles Asistencia, to tend to their religious needs. The pueblo eventually built its own parish church, known today as the "Old Plaza Church." The original 18th-century plaza was approximately a block north and west of the present one. Unpredictable flooding forced the settlers to abandon the original site and move to higher ground in the early 1800s, with the current Plaza at the center of the newly moved pueblo.

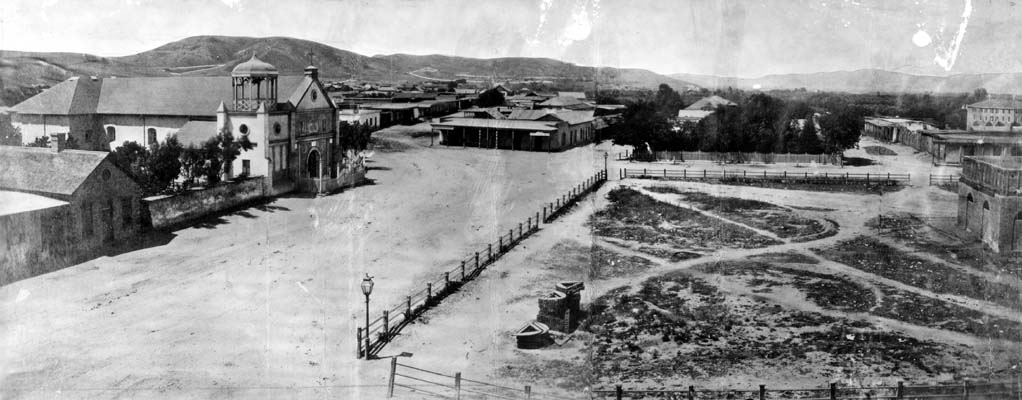
The "Old Plaza Church" facing Los Angeles Plaza, 1869. The brick reservoir in the middle of the Plaza was the original terminus of the Zanja Madre

Spanish colonial rule lasted until Mexican independence in 1821. This period saw Los Angeles's first streets and adobe buildings. During Mexican rule, which lasted twenty-six years, the Plaza was the heart of a vibrant ethnic Californio community life in Los Angeles and was the center of an economy based upon farming in the former flood plain, supplemented with cattle ranching.

The Pelanconi House was, in the second half of the 19th century, a winery producing wine from the grapes that grew there, and to this day still do. The DNA matches that of grapes at Mission San Gabriel, established in 1771.

After the Mexican War, the Plaza remained the center of town. A small alley branching off of the Plaza, Wine Street, had its name changed by City Council ordinance in 1877 to Olvera Street to honor Agustin Olvera, the first Superior Court Judge of Los Angeles County, who owned a no-longer-existing adobe house nearby. In the 1880s, the little town grew rapidly due to the influx of settlers from Southern States. These joined the Spaniards and earlier English-speaking settlers who had become voting citizens before 1846.

As the town expanded, the original area of settlement came to be neglected, and served as a neighborhood for new immigrants, especially Mexicans and Sicilians. It included a Chinese community, which eventually relocated to the present nearby Chinatown to make way for the construction of Union Station. During the 1920s, the pace of Mexican immigration increased rapidly. California was the primary destination, with Los Angeles being a common choice. As a part of a movement to preserve what was viewed as California's "authentic" heritage, Christine Sterling began a public campaign to renovate the Francisco Avila Adobe, which evolved into a campaign to remake Olvera street as a modern Mexican-style market place.

=== Preservation and restoration ===
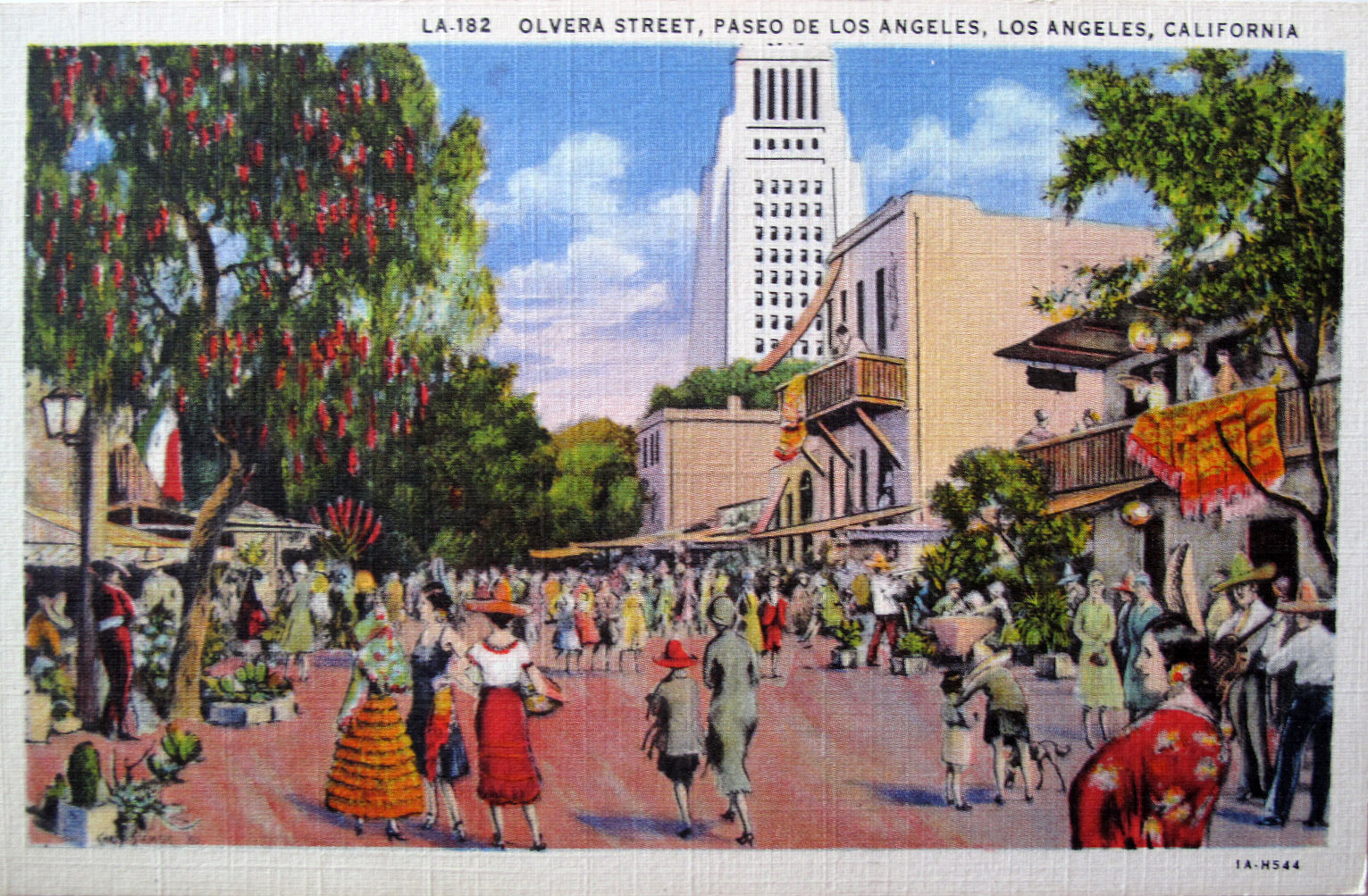
Postcard depicting Olvera Street, c. 1920-1940

Sterling's efforts to rescue the area began in 1926, when she learned of a plan to demolish the Avila Adobe, the oldest existing home in the city. After raising the issue with the Los Angeles Chamber of Commerce, Sterling approached Harry Chandler, the publisher of the Los Angeles Times, with a plan to create a Mexican marketplace and cultural center in the Plaza. Chandler was intrigued by the idea of packaging the Plaza area that acknowledged the Mexican heritage of the city while presenting a romanticized ersatz version, an ethnic theme park. He helped by providing extensive publicity and supporting the development plan in The Times.

By 1928, due to a lack of financial support for implementing her ideas, the project appeared to be doomed. In late November, Sterling found a Los Angeles City Health Department Notice of Condemnation posted in front of the Avila Adobe. In response, she posted her own hand-painted sign condemning the shortsightedness of city bureaucrats in failing to preserve an important historic site. Her act helped attract additional public interest in preserving the old adobe. The Los Angeles City Council finally reversed its original order of condemnation. Support for restoring the adobe rushed in from throughout the city. Building materials came from several local companies, including Blue Diamond Cement and the Simmons Brick Company, one of the largest employers of Mexicans in the Los Angeles area. Los Angeles Police Chief James Davis provided a crew of prison inmates to do hard labor on the project. Sterling oversaw the construction project, and an excerpt from her diary vividly captures her spirit and sense of desperation for financial support during the construction: "One of the prisoners is a good carpenter, another an electrician. Each night I pray they will arrest a bricklayer and a plumber."

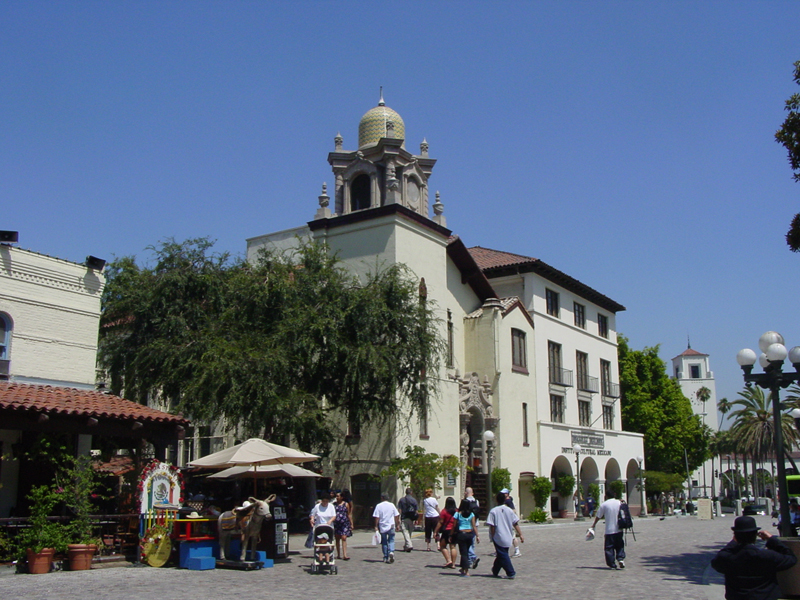
Entrance to Olvera Street

In spite of ample supplies and forced volunteers, the project lacked solid financial backing until Chandler came forward with capital for the project through funds collected at $1,000-a-plate luncheons with selected businessmen. Chandler established and headed the Plaza de Los Angeles Corporation, a for-profit venture which became the financial basis for the restoration of Plaza-Olvera. The street was closed to automotive traffic in 1929.

On Easter Sunday 1930, Sterling's romantic revival came to pass with the opening of Paseo de Los Angeles (which later became popularly known by its official street name Olvera Street). Touted as "A Mexican Street of Yesterday in a City of Today", Olvera Street was an instant success as a tourist site. La Opinión, a leading Spanish-language daily, praised the project as "una calleja que recuerda al México viejo" (a street which recalls old Mexico).

== Events ==
The Olvera Street Merchants Association Foundation (OSMAF) has organized a wide range of free year round programming of activities and traditional events for over 80 years including: Three Kings Celebrations, Blessing of the Animals, Muertos Artwalk, Dia de los Muertos, and Las Posadas.

=== Blessing of the Animals event ===
The Blessing of the Animals at Olvera Street, an event dating to 1930, is held every Sábado de Gloria (Holy Saturday, the Saturday before Easter). The event was originally held in conjunction with the Feast Day of Saint Anthony of the Desert, but it was changed to take advantage of better weather. The original procession has grown into an all-day event with vendors, performers, and a procession where participants bring their animals to be blessed by religious authorities and others.

The event is held near the Biscailuz Building and is represented by a mural on its exterior, The Blessing of the Animals, by Leo Politi. The event is also the subject of a book by the same name.

=== Dia de los Muertos ===
In celebration of Dia de los Muertos, the Olvera Street Merchants Association Foundation organizes a 9-day festival with a nightly procession, community alters, and entertainment. The event incorporates pre-Columbian, Aztec, Maya, and Catholic rituals surrounding death.

=== Las Posadas ===
Since 1930, Las Posadas has been celebrated in Olvera Street. The 9-day festival reenacts the journey of Mary and Joseph to Bethlehem. Each night, the event starts with the breaking of the children's piñata. he procession begins at Avila Adobe, where visitors follow Mary, Joseph, shepherds, and musicians while singing traditional songs in Spanish and English. The procession makes a stop at an Olvera Street shop where Mary and Joseph ask for shelter and ends at Avila Adobe.

== Landmarks ==
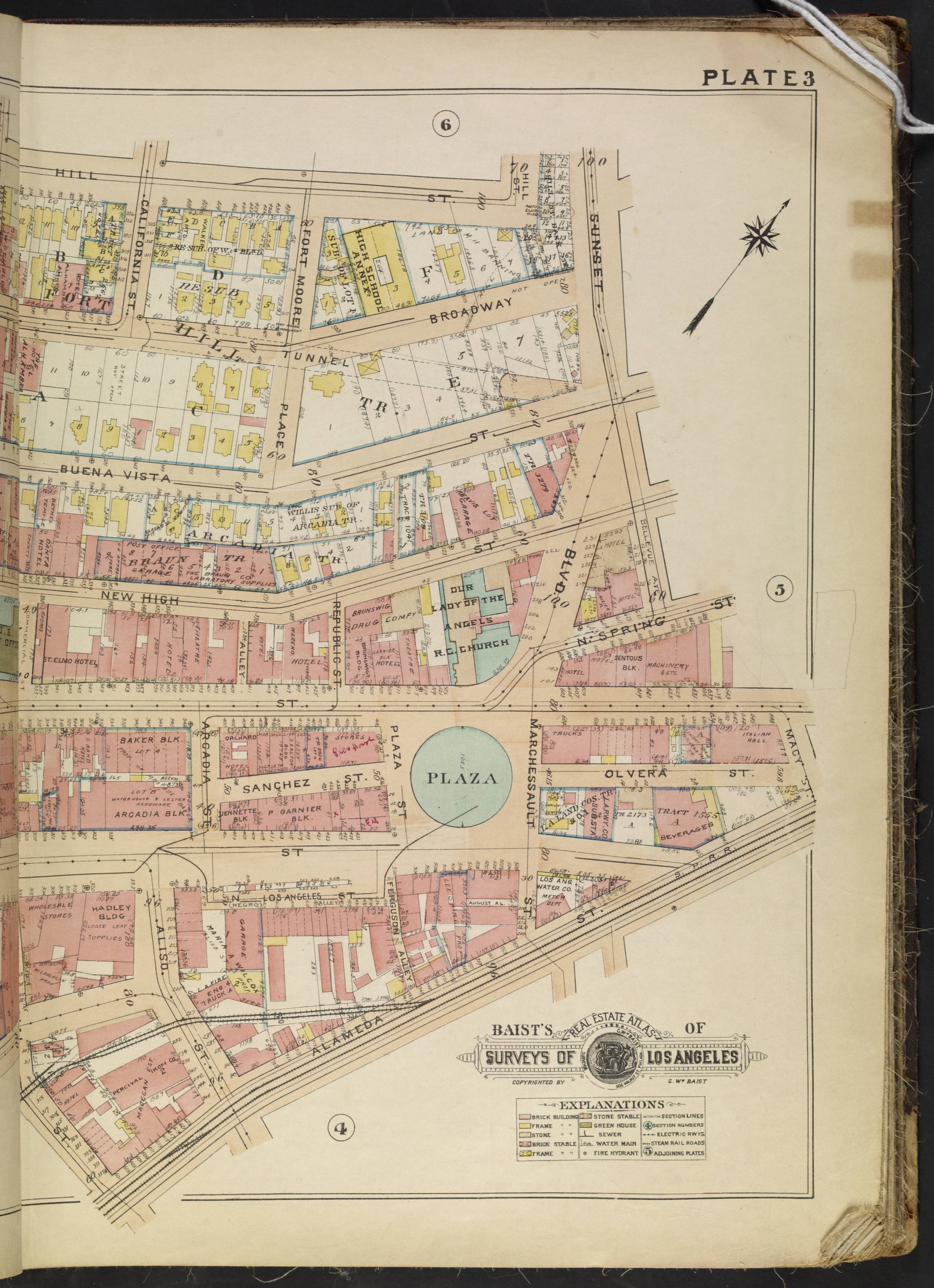
The Plaza and Olvera Street in 1921

=== Avila Adobe ===
The Avila Adobe at 10 Olvera Street was built in 1818 and is the oldest surviving residence in Los Angeles. It was built by Francisco Ávila, a wealthy cattle rancher. Its adobe walls are 2½ to 3 feet (0.91 m) thick. U. S. Navy Commodore Robert Stockton took it over as his temporary headquarters when the United States first occupied the city in 1846. Listed on the National Register of Historic Places, the adobe is also designated as California State Landmark No. 145. It was restored starting 1926 through efforts by Christine Sterling, and now stands as a museum.

=== Sepulveda House ===
The Sepulveda House at 12 Olvera Street is a historic residence built in 1887 by Señora Eloisa Martinez de Sepulveda in the Eastlake architectural style. The original structure included two commercial businesses and three residences. It has since then become a preserved museum, and is cited by its website as a representation of the "blending of Mexican and Anglo culture".

Eloisa Martínez de Sepúlveda was born in the state of Sonora in Mexico. She lived there until 1844 when her parents, Francisca Gallardo and Estaquio Martinez, moved to Alta California at the urging of Francisca’s brother, bringing the 11-year-old Eloisa and her older brother Luis, with them to Los Angeles. In 1847, Señora Francisca Gallardo received from the ayuntamiento (Common Council) a plot of land between Bath and Wine street (renamed Olvera Street in 1877) on which she constructed an adobe residence. Señora Gallardo’s adobe home at number 12 Bath Street was later enlarged to include by 1870 a second story and hipped roof. When Eloisa married Joaquin Sepulveda at the age of 23, she brought with her a dowry of land and cattle. Joaquin was an undistinguished member of an illustrious Southern California family. The marriage suffered from misfortune as the couple’s only child died in infancy and Joaquin himself died in 1880 leaving no property. Señora Gallardo gave her property to her widowed daughter, Eloisa Martinez de Sepulveda, in 1881. On lands owned by her mother, Eloisa was able to finance the construction of a commercial building which provided her with a steady income. This was the Sepulveda Block, built in 1887.

Señora Eloisa Martinez de Sepulveda built the two-story Sepulveda Block in 1887 in response to the city’s real estate and population boom of the 1800s. The twenty-two room building cost $8,000 to erect. As her husband, Joaquin Sepulveda, had died seven years earlier leaving no estate, Señora Sepulveda probably financed the construction of the building on her own. By 1888 Bath Street had been renamed Main Street and the city had realigned and widened it, cutting off 18 feet (5.5 m) from the front of the adobe. Señora Sepulveda received $1,190 in compensation.

When the Sepulveda Block was built in 1887 Señora Eloisa Sepulveda kept a suite of three rooms for her own use. Her bedroom reveals much about her Mexican heritage and the popular tastes and styles of the time. It would also reflect some of the places in Los Angeles in the decades following her arrival from Sonora in 1844. The décor of the room shows a practical acceptance of modern technology and contemporary fashion, with its mass-produced walnut furniture and gaslight chandelier. The bedroom has three different wallpapers and a typical flowered carpet. The somewhat-cluttered appearance is characteristic of the period and a sign of modest prosperity. By contrast, the brass bed with its draperies and fancy spread, the Chinese shawl, and the well-tended shrine are representative of Señora Sepulveda’s Mexican upbringing and her strong religious beliefs. The large crucifix is on loan from Señora Sepulveda’s descendants while the bed belonged to the Avila family, who were related to her by marriage. The pastel portrait is of her favorite niece, Eloisa Martinez de Gibbs.

Señora Sepulveda chose American architects George F. Costerisan and William O. Merithew to design her two-story business block for residential and commercial rental in 1887. Although this particular type of building is probably unique in Los Angeles today, it was a “pattern book” building of a style that was common all over the country at the time. An exception in this building is the typically Mexican breezeway which separates the Main Street stores from the dwelling rooms in the rear. Thus, the Sepulveda Block represents the transition in Los Angeles from Mexican to a combination of Anglo and Mexican styles. The work “block” is the Victorian term for a large commercial building. By this time the city had changed from a Mexican pueblo with a cattle-based economy to an American town with an agricultural economy. The population had grown from less than 2,000, most of whom were Mexican, to over 50,000, only 19% of whom were Mexican. When the building was constructed it appears that Señora Sepulveda herself occupied the three residential rooms located in the rear, facing Olvera Street, then an unpaved alley. Later, she may have occupied other quarters. Commercial tenants were located in the stores fronting on Main Street while the second floor was used as a boarding house.

Señora Sepulveda bequeathed the building on her death in 1903 to her favorite niece and goddaughter, Eloisa Martinez de Gibbs. Edward Gibbs, an engineer and lumber company owner, had been a tenant in the Sepulveda Block. In 1888, the same year that he and Eloisa were married, Edward was elected to the City Council. Four of their five children were born in the second floor facing Main Street on the south side. In 1905, along with many other residents of the area, the Gibbs moved to a more fashionable neighborhood in Los Angeles. Succeeding generations of the Gibbs family operated the Gibbs Electrical Company and retained ownership of the Sepulveda Block until it was acquired by the State of California for $135,000 in 1958 as part of the Pueblo de Los Angeles State Historic Monument.

Between 1982 and 1984 major restoration took place in the Sepulveda Block. The building was structurally stabilized and plumbing, heating, air conditioning and electrical systems were installed. A new roof replaced the old one and the front staircase, which had been removed in the 1930s, was put back. The iron cresting is restored as are the red tin tiles over the bay windows. The west façade is “penciled” in the style of the period, meaning that the bricks are painted and mortar lines are traced in white on top. The east façade on Olvera Street, although not originally painted, had previously been sandblasted, a process which destroys the outer surface of the brick, making it porous. As paint provides bricks with protective coating, they have been painted with the color which was first used in 1919. A 1983 archeological excavation beneath the wooden floor unearthed artifacts relating to the building’s history. Peter Snell, partner with Long Hoeft Architects and Gus Duffy Architect, were the firms responsible for the Sepulveda Block restoration plans and construction supervision.

During World War II the Sepulveda Block became a canteen for servicemen and three Olvera Street merchants were located in the building. The building continued to be used by Olvera Street merchants until 1981 when they were relocated for the building’s restoration. Today, El Pueblo Park’s Visitor’s Center is located in the south store on the ground floor. This room represents the Victorian Eastlake style of 1890. Restoration plans call for the creation of an 1890s grocery store on the north side of the first floor.

=== Mural América Tropical ===
The mural América Tropical (full name: América Tropical: Oprimida y Destrozada por los Imperialismos, or Tropical America: Oppressed and Destroyed by Imperialism,) by David Siqueiros, was unveiled above the street in 1932. It was soon covered up to mask its political content. The Getty Conservation Institute has performed detailed conservation work on the mural to restore it and the America Tropical Interpretive Center opened to provide public access.

=== Plaza Substation ===
The Plaza Substation, also at 10 Olvera Street, was part of the electric streetcar system operated by the Los Angeles Railway. Completed in 1904, the substation provided electricity to power the yellow streetcars. When the streetcar system closed in the 1940s, the building was converted to other uses. The substation is one of the two buildings in the district that is separately listed in the National Register of Historic Places (the Avila Adobe is the other).

=== Pelanconi House ===
Pelanconi House at 17 Olvera Street, built in the 1850s, is the oldest surviving brick house in Los Angeles. In 1924, it was converted into a restaurant called La Golondrina, which was the oldest restaurant on Olvera Street until its closure in March 2020 during the COVID-19 pandemic. The Pelanconi House was a winery producing wine from the grapes that grew in the area, possibly even inside the Avila Adobe where they grow currently. The DNA matches that of grapes at Mission San Gabriel, established in 1771.

=== Plaza Methodist Church ===
Built in 1926, the Plaza Methodist Church was built on the site of the adobe once owned by Agustín Olvera, the man for whom Olvera Street was named. It is at the southeast corner of Olvera Street and Paseo de la Plaza (i.e. the Plaza).

=== Eugene Biscailuz Building ===
The former United Methodist Church headquarters, also built in 1926, was renamed in 1965 for Sheriff Eugene W. Biscailuz, who had helped Christine Sterling to preserve and transform Olvera Street. It housed the Mexican Consulate until 1991 and then the Mexican Cultural Institute.

== Reception ==
The American Planning Association named Olvera Street one of the top five "Great Streets" in the United States for 2015.

Some find Olvera Street to be a sanitized fabrication of Latin American culture merely to attract tourists, a "fake" Mexican presence; since 1926, it has garnered controversy as historians and collectors have attempted to preserve the sites for historic study and educational purposes. In contrast, there are researchers that often cite that Olvera Street is an "appropriated" misnomer of Latin-American and Hispanic culture, and should therefore not remain as a source of tourism. Even critics though, have acknowledged how the city fathers were ready to condemn and destroy the area in the 1920s. The attention brought to the area shamed the city into saving its heritage and preserving some of the original adobe buildings. This tension around an idealized cultural image is evident in the mural América Tropical (full name: América Tropical: Oprimida y Destrozada por los Imperialismos, or Tropical America: Oppressed and Destroyed by Imperialism) by David Siqueiros which was slated to be an exciting addition to the street until it was actually unveiled in 1932. The Getty Conservation Institute began performing detailed conservation work on the mural in 2010 and the America Tropical Interpretive Center opened to provide public access in 2012.

== In popular culture ==
- William M. Pizor produced a narrated travelogue short film about the street in 1937 titled A Street of Memory. It is extant.
- "Golondrina", an opera by Lindsey C. Harnsberger was composed in 2015 to a libretto by Robert Cartland. The opera, originally titled "Olvera Street," was premiered by Vineyard Touring Opera Company (VTO) in November 2017 in Los Angeles, Santa Monica, and South Pasadena, California. It was revised and retitled in 2017 for April and May performances by VTO in Glendale and South Pasadena, California. The story of the opera is based on Christine Sterling's fight to save the Avila Adobe and later restore Olvera Street.
- The plaza, before it was improved, can be seen in Charlie Chaplin's 1921 film The Kid, which featured a number of scenes of the west side of the plaza a few doors north of the Pelanconi House.

== See also ==
- LA Plaza de Cultura y Artes
- Rancho Camulos
- Rancho San Francisco
- History of Los Angeles
- List of Registered Historic Places in Los Angeles
