= América Tropical: Oprimida y Destrozada por los Imperialismos =

1932 mural by David Alfaro Siqueiros

- Tropical America: Oppressed and Destroyed by Imperialism (English)
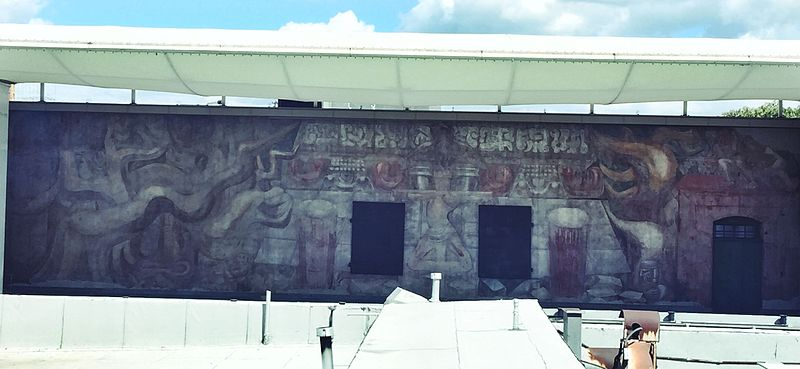
- Artist: David Alfaro Siqueiros
- Year: 1932
- Type: Mural
- Dimensions: 18 by 82 feet (5.5 m × 25.0 m)
- Condition: Restored in 2012
- Location: Los Angeles; 34°03′28.5″N 118°14′16″W

América Tropical is a 98-foot wide fresco mural (30 m) created in 1932 by David Alfaro Siqueiros and other artists in Los Angeles, California, on a second-level exterior wall of the Italian Hall. It was painted over soon after its completion on an external wall of the Italian Hall on Olvera Street, in El Pueblo de Los Angeles Historical Monument of Downtown Los Angeles. It was restored and revealed to the public in 2012, 80 years to the day after its first unveiling.

== History ==
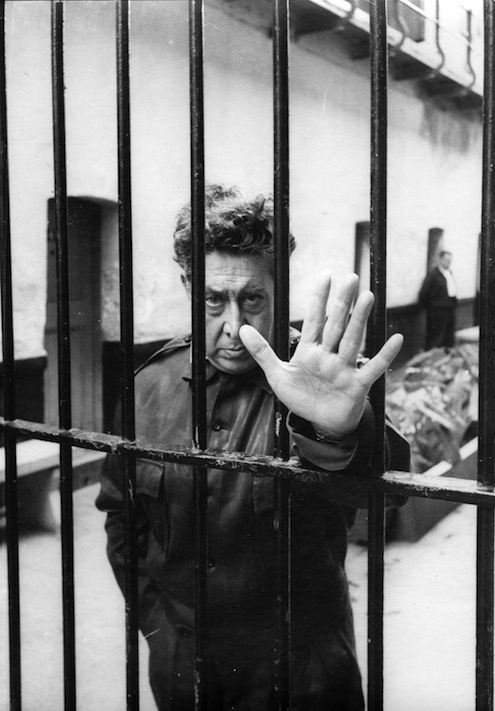
David Alfaro Siqueiros, 1960

Siqueiros came to Los Angeles as a political refugee in 1932 and was sponsored by the Plaza Art Center to create a mural that was supposed to be about happy men, parrots, and palms with fruit falling into the mouths of people. Siqueiros completely ignored the institutional project request in pursuit of his own unique artistic idea by creating a mural, which turned out to be one of the most controversial art pieces in Los Angeles history, Tropical America (full name: América Tropical: Oprimida y Destrozada por los Imperialismos, or Tropical America: Oppressed and Destroyed by Imperialism).

The mural became the center of controversy, as the painting depicted a Maya-like pyramid with surrounding twisted trees, and in the center was an indigenous person crucified, dead on a double edged cross. There are sculptures lying at the bottom of the mural, destroyed, which signify pre-Columbian architecture and ancient indigenous civilization. On the left side of the pyramid there are two snipers overlooking the imperial American eagle which is on top of the crucified indigenous person and the two Mexican revolutionary snipers look ready to shoot at any time.

América Tropical is an emblematic part of the Mexican muralism movement that happened from the 1920s–1970s and later inspired the Chicano art movement in the United States for Mexican-Americans. Siqueiros also belonged to one of the most elite groups of artists from the Mexican Revolution known as "the big three", along with Diego Rivera and José Clemente Orozco. The three of them went around all over the Americas painting murals that depicted the struggles of people.

=== Restoration ===
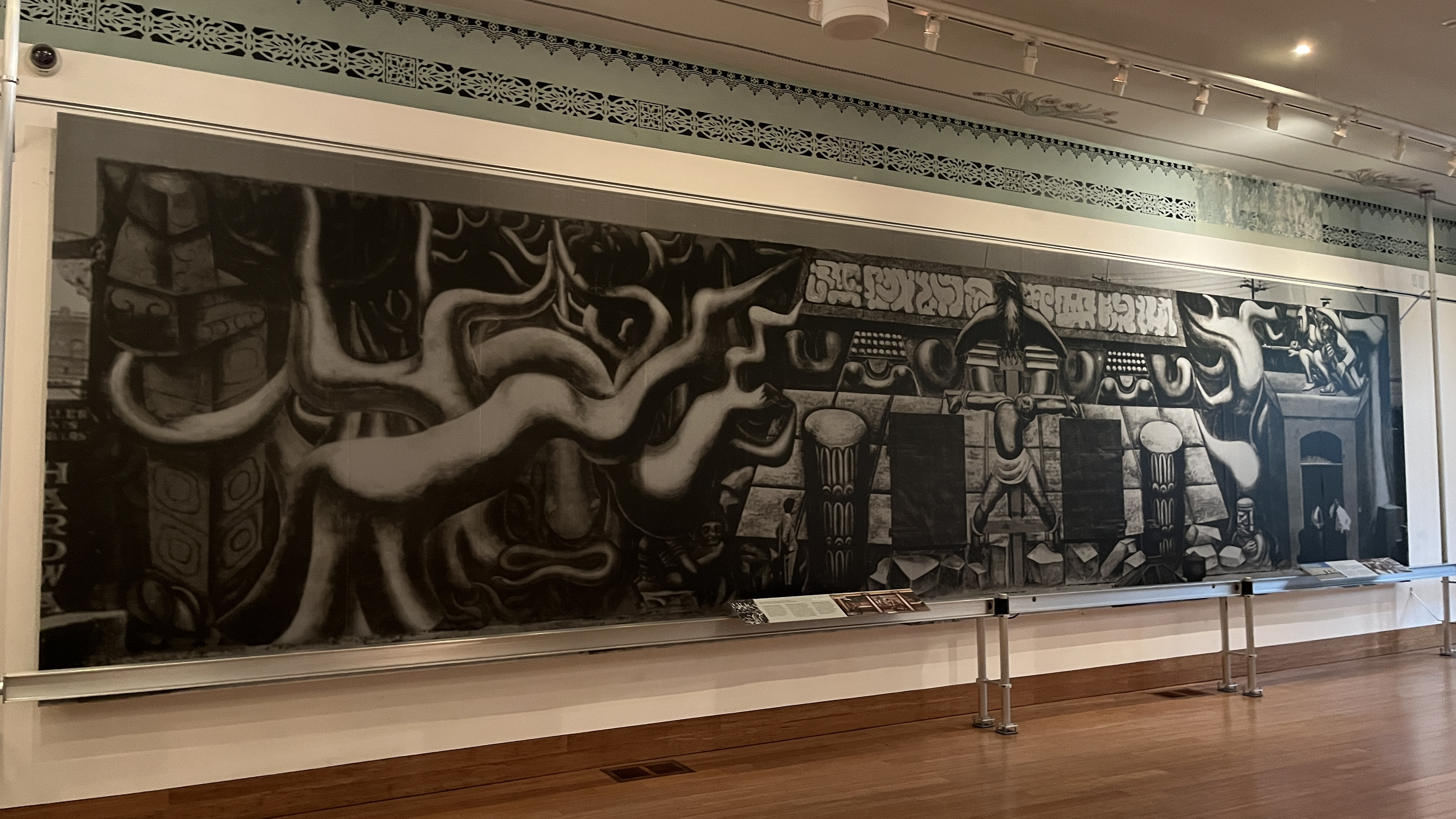
A photo of the América Tropical mural within the Interpretive Center

For the restoration of Siqueiros' mural, the Getty Foundation, via the Getty Conservation Institute, spent 3.95 million dollars on a restoration project, while the city of Los Angeles contributed 5 million dollars for the conservation of the mural. The project's scope is to conserve, interpret, and provide public access to the mural.

Josephina Quezada and Jaime Mejía were brought in to restore the mural in 1971, but opted to preserve the mural instead of restoring it at that time. At the time, Siqueiros declined the preservation of his mural.

Work has been completed on: documentation, cleaning, reattachment, stabilization, and treatment of the mural; constructing a shelter and viewing platform on an adjacent roof with elevator access; and the América Tropical Interpretive Center.

== See also ==
- Murals of Los Angeles
