= Museo Cabeza de Juárez =

Museum in Iztapalapa, Mexico City

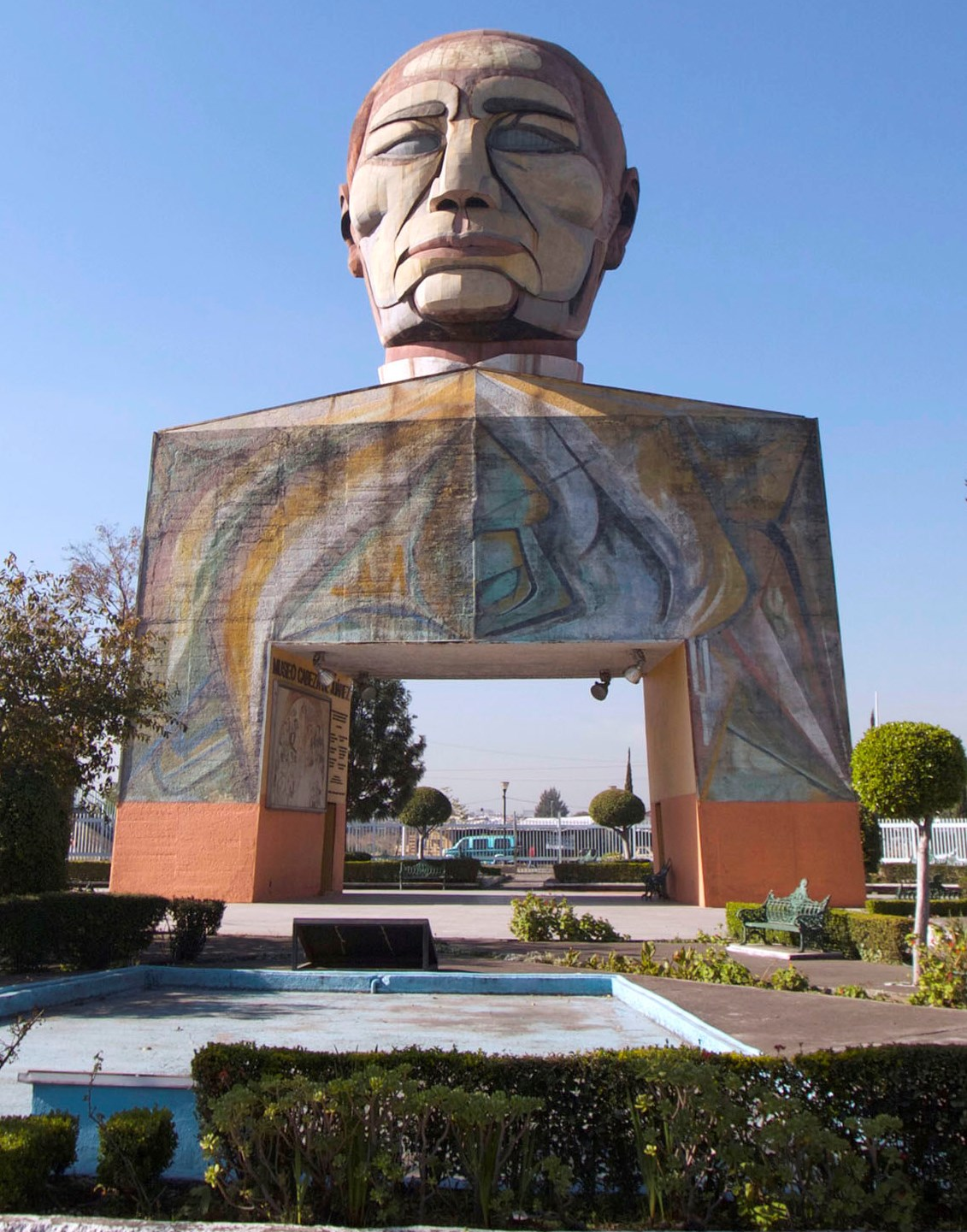
- The museum in 2020
- Location in Mexico City
- Established: 21 March 1976
- Location: Iztapalapa, Mexico City
- Coordinates: 19°22′57.7″N 99°02′20.6″W
- Public transit access: Guelatao metro station
- Website: sic.gob.mx/museo_cabeza_de_juárez

The Museo Cabeza de Juárez (English: Head of Juárez Museum) is a museum and monument in Iztapalapa, Mexico City. The top of the structure features a colossal head of Benito Juárez, the 26th president of Mexico. Luis Echeverría, the 57th president of the country, ordered its erection in 1972 – a century after Juárez's death – and it was inaugurated on 21 March 1976, the 170th anniversary of Juárez's birth. The museum's collection features the chronology of Juárez's life, and its esplanade is open for cultural events. Artists Luis Arenal Bastar and David Alfaro Siqueiros were involved in its construction and design.

== History and construction ==
Luis Echeverría ordered the erection of a monument to Benito Juárez in 1972. The selected space was a roundabout along Guelatao Avenue (Note: Guelatao, Oaxaca, was Juárez's birthplace.) in Iztapalapa, Mexico City. Architects Lorenzo Carrasco Ortiz and Miguel Ramírez Bautista designed the civil work. Meanwhile, David Alfaro Siqueiros was hired to paint murals on the walls, but his health began to deteriorate and he died in 1974. Luis Arenal Bastar, Siqueiros's brother-in-law, replaced him and additionally sculpted the colossal head with help of Carrasco Ortiz.

After its inauguration, the sculpture ceased to receive federal support and fell into decline. It was not until 2000 that it received its first major restoration by the government of the city, where the plinth was transformed into a museum. Following the earthquake of 19 September 2017, the museum received minor damage and the subsequent maintenance cost two million pesos. During the process, signs of corrosion and various bullet impacts were found.

The plinth-transformed-into-museum is 12.38 meters (40.6 ft) high, 15.95 meters (52.3 ft) wide and 6.09 meters (20.0 ft) deep. The external walls are painted with abstract murals. They were inspired by the murals Estampas de Guerrero by Arenal and the Mural Cuauhtémoc contra el mito by Siqueiros. The head sculpture weighs 6 metric tons (5.9 long tons; 6.6 short tons) and is 13 meters (43 ft) high. Iron sheets were used to sculpt the concrete. The head originally would have had a neck and shoulders, with channels to protect it from the accumulation of water. Inside the museum, there is a collection with the chronology of Juárez's life, as well as some works by Siqueiros, Diego Rivera, José Clemente Orozco and Rufino Tamayo. Its esplanade is open for cultural events and the roundabout has a size of 64,732 meters (212,375 ft).

== Reception ==
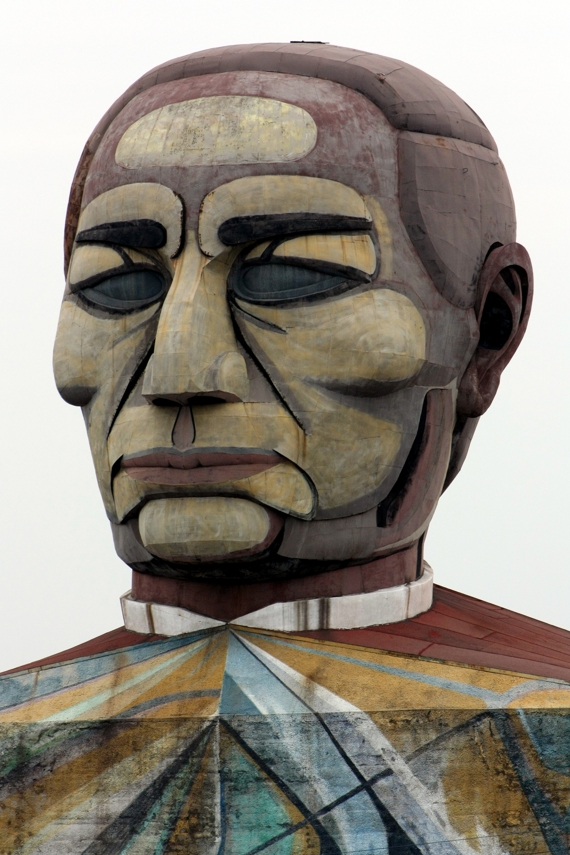
Close-up of the head

Art critic Alberto Híjar Serrano said that the sculpture is "an exaltation to the patriotic sense of the liberals and their importance in the construction of modern Mexico". Writer Carlos Monsiváis considered it "guillotined par excellence, horrible and terrible". The head commonly appears on lists of the country's ugliest sculptures. In a 2017 poll, 27.76 percent of voters rated it the ugliest in the city. The head inspired the pictogram of the Guelatao metro station of the Mexico City Metro, which is the closest to the museum. Blogger Tamara De Anda named it one of the system's worst pictograms.
