= David Alfaro Siqueiros =

Mexican social realist painter (1896–1974)

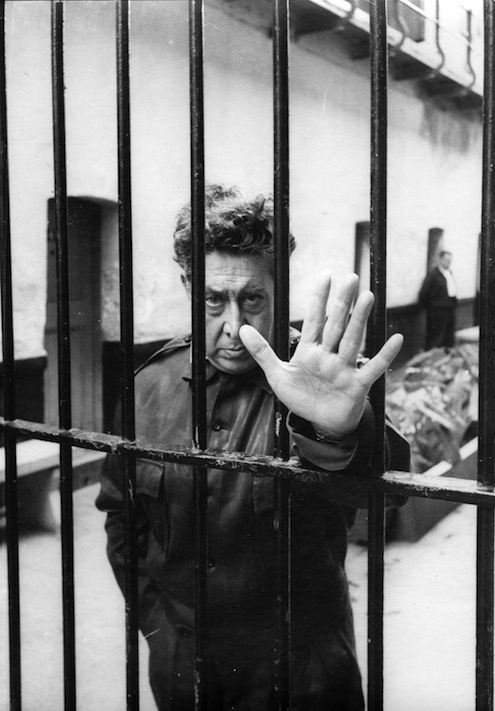
- Siqueiros by Héctor García Cobo at Lecumberri prison, Mexico City, 1960
- Born: José de Jesús Alfaro Siqueiros; December 29, 1896; Santa Rosalía de Camargo, Chihuahua, Mexico
- Died: January 6, 1974 (aged 77); Cuernavaca, Morelos, Mexico
- Education: San Carlos Academy
- Known for: Painting, Muralist
- Notable work: Portrait of the Bourgeoisie (1939–1940), The March of Humanity (1957–1971)
- Movement: Mexican Mural Movement, Social Realism
- Awards: Lenin Peace Prize 1966
- Military career
- Allegiance: Mexico; Spain
- Branch: Constitutionalist Army; International Brigades
- Service years: 1914–1919; 1937–1938
- Rank: Captain (MX); Lt. Col. (SP)
- Conflicts: Mexican Revolution; Spanish Civil War

Signature
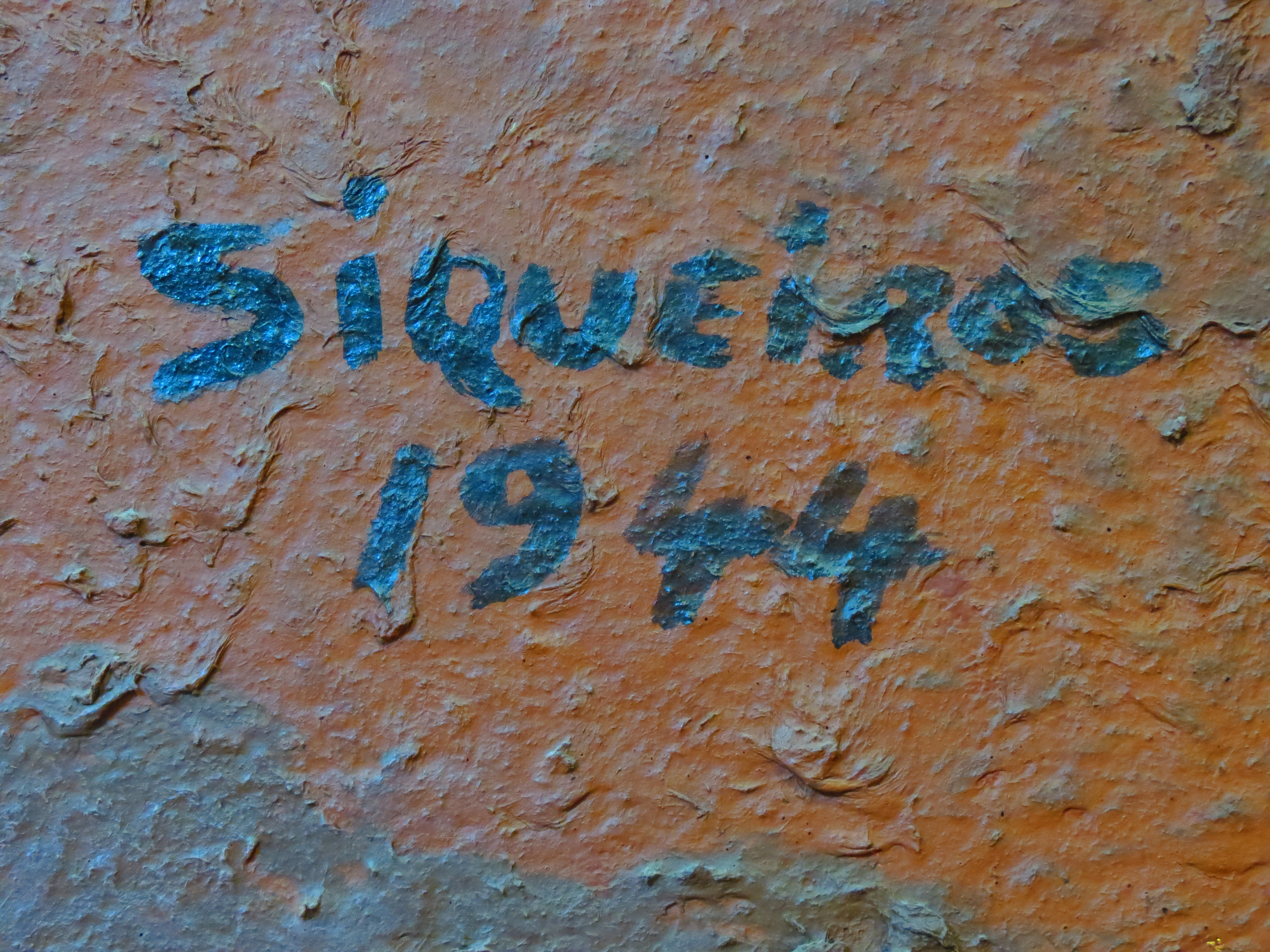

David Alfaro Siqueiros (born José de Jesús Alfaro Siqueiros; December 29, 1896 – January 6, 1974) was a Mexican social realist painter, best known for his large public murals using the latest in equipment, materials and technique. Along with Diego Rivera and José Clemente Orozco, he was one of the most famous of the "Mexican muralists".

Siqueiros was a member of the Mexican Communist Party. Although he went to Spain to support the Spanish Republic against the forces of Francisco Franco with his art, he volunteered and served in frontline combat as a Lieutenant Colonel in the Army of the Republic through 1938 before returning to Mexico City. In 1940, he led a failed assassination attempt on Leon Trotsky in which Trotsky's 14-year-old grandson was shot and American communist Robert Sheldon Harte was executed. After spending several months on the run from Mexican authorities disguised as a peasant, Siqueiros was eventually apprehended in Jalisco, although he was freed shortly thereafter and never brought to trial.

By accordance with Spanish naming customs, his surname would normally have been Alfaro; however, like Picasso (Pablo Ruiz y Picasso) and Lorca (Federico García Lorca), Siqueiros used his mother's surname. It was long believed that he was born in Camargo in Chihuahua state, but in 2003 it was proven that he was born in the city of Chihuahua after the discovery of his birth certificate, but grew up in Irapuato, Guanajuato, at least from the age of six. According to Victor Mendoza Magallanes, he was born in Santa Rosalia in modern-day Camargo, Chihuahua. One source says that the discovery of his birth certificate in 2003 was by a Mexican art curator the following year by art critic Raquel Tibol, who was renowned as the leading authority on Mexican Muralism and who had been a close acquaintance of Siqueiros, although there hasn't been any evidence to prove this. Siqueiros changed his given name to "David" after his first wife called him by it in allusion to Michelangelo's David.

== Early life ==
Many details of Siqueiros's childhood, including birth date, birthplace, first name and where he grew up, were misstated during his life and long after his death, in some cases by himself. Multiple sources have stated he was born in Santa Rosalia in modern day Camargo, Chihuahua.

Siqueiros was born in 1896, the second of three children. He was baptized José de Jesús Alfaro Siqueiros. His father, Cipriano Alfaro, originally from Irapuato, was well-off. His mother was Teresa Siqueiros. Siqueiros had two siblings: a sister, Luz, three years elder, and a brother "Chucho" (Jesús), a year younger. David's mother died when he was four and their father sent the children to live with their paternal grandparents. David's grandfather, nicknamed "Siete Filos" ('seven knife-edges'), had an especially strong role in his upbringing. In 1902, Siqueiros started school in Irapuato, Guanajuato.

He credits his first rebellious influence to his sister, who had resisted their father's religious orthodoxy. Around this time, Siqueiros was also exposed to new political ideas, mainly along the lines of anarcho-syndicalism. One such political theorist was Dr. Atl, who published a manifesto in 1906 calling for Mexican artists to develop a national art and look to ancient indigenous cultures for inspiration. In 1911, at the age of fifteen, Siqueiros was involved in a student strike at the Academy of San Carlos of the National Academy of Fine Arts that protested the school's teaching methodology and urged the impeachment of the school's director. Their protests eventually led to the establishment of an "open-air academy" in Santa Anita.

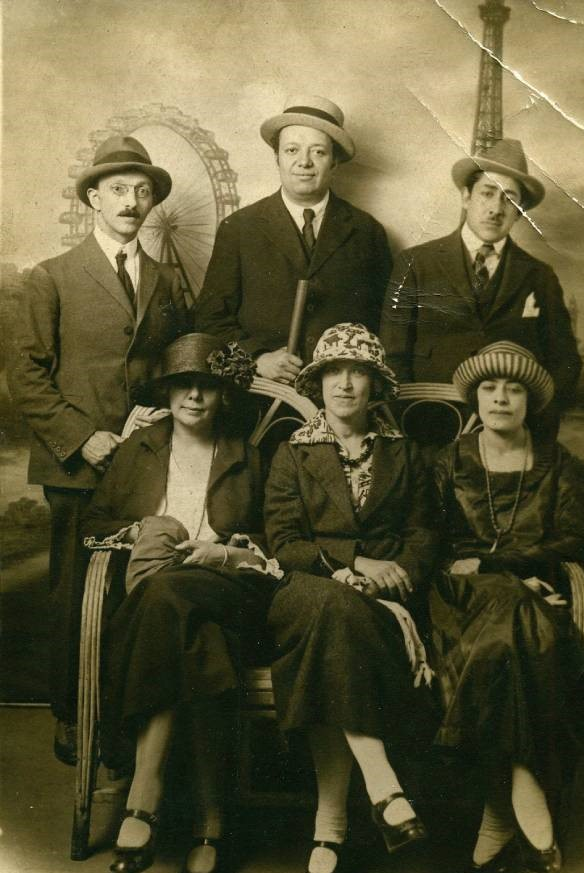
(From left to right, top to bottom) Leon Caillou, Diego Rivera, David Alfaro Siqueiros, Magda Caillou, Angelina Beloff, Graciela Amador in Paris, 1920

At the age of eighteen, Siqueiros and several of his colleagues from the School of Fine Arts joined Venustiano Carranza's Constitutional Army fighting the government of President Victoriano Huerta. When Huerta fell in 1914, Siqueiros became enmeshed in the "post-revolutionary" infighting, as the Constitutional Army battled the diverse political factions of Pancho Villa and Emiliano Zapata for control. His military travels around the country exposed him to Mexican culture and the raw, everyday struggles of the working and rural poor classes. After Carranza's forces had gained control, Siqueiros briefly returned to Mexico City to paint before traveling to Europe in 1919. First in Paris, he absorbed the influence of cubism, intrigued particularly with Paul Cézanne and the use of large blocks of intense color. While there, he also met Diego Rivera, another Mexican painter of "the Big Three" on the brink of a legendary career in muralism, and he traveled to Italy to study the great fresco painters of the Renaissance. In Barcelona he published a magazine, La vida Americana, in which he issued a manifesto to the artists of America to reject the decadent influence of Europe and create a new form of public art with the latest tools and technology.

== Early art and politics ==
Although many have said that Siqueiros' artistic ventures were frequently "interrupted" by political ones, Siqueiros himself believed the two were intricately intertwined. By 1921, when he wrote his manifesto in Vida Americana, Siqueiros had already been exposed to Marxism and seen the life of the working and rural poor while traveling with the Constitutional Army. In "A New Direction for the New Generation of American Painters and Sculptors", he called for a "spiritual renewal" to simultaneously bring back the virtues of classical painting while infusing this style with "new values" that acknowledged the "modern machine" and the "contemporary aspects of daily life". The manifesto also claimed that a "constructive spirit" is essential to meaningful art, which rises above mere decoration or false, fantastical themes. Through this style, Siqueiros hoped to create a style that would bridge national and universal art. In his work, as well as his writing, Siqueiros sought a social realism that hailed the proletariat peoples of Mexico and the world, even as it attempted to avoid the widespread clichés of "Primitivism" and "Indianism".

In 1922, Siqueiros returned to Mexico City to work as a muralist for Álvaro Obregón's revolutionary government. The then Secretary of Public Education, José Vasconcelos, made a mission of educating the masses through public art, and hired scores of artists and writers to build a modern Mexican culture. Siqueiros, Rivera and Orozco worked together under Vasconcelos, who supported the muralist movement by commissioning murals for prominent buildings in Mexico City. Still, the artists working at the Preparatoria realized that many of their early works lacked the "public" nature envisioned in their ideology. In 1923 Siqueiros helped found the Syndicate of Revolutionary Mexican Painters, Sculptors and Engravers, which addressed the problem of public access to art through its paper, El Machete. That year Siqueiros helped author a manifesto in the newspaper "for the proletariat of the world". It addressed the necessity of "collective" art, which would serve as "ideological propaganda" to educate the masses and overcome bourgeois, individualist art.

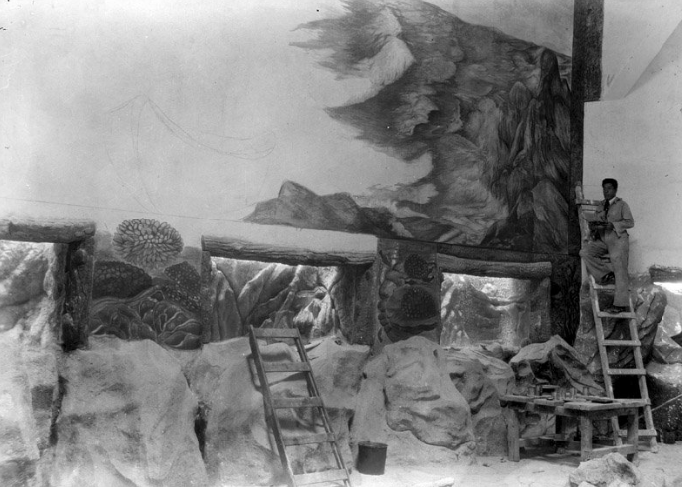
Siqueiros painting a mural circa 1925

Soon after, Siqueiros painted his famous mural Burial of a Worker (1923) in the stairwell of the Colegio Chico. The fresco features a group of pre-Conquest style workers in a funeral procession that are carrying a giant coffin, decorated with a hammer and sickle. The mural was never finished and was vandalized by students at the school who did not agree with the work's overtly political subject matter. Eventually, the entire mural was whitewashed by the new Minister of Education who succeeded Vasconcelos. The Syndicate became ever more critical of the revolutionary government, due to the State's failure to deliver on promised reforms. As a result, its members faced new threats to cut funding for their art and the newspaper. A feud within the Syndicate—regarding a choice between publishing El Machete or losing financial support for mural projects—led to Siqueiros moving to the forefront of the organization, when Rivera left in protest over the decision to prioritize politics over art. Despite being dismissed from a post at the Department of Education in 1925, Siqueiros remained deeply involved in labor activities, in the Syndicate as well as the Mexican Communist Party, until he was jailed and eventually exiled in the early 1930s.

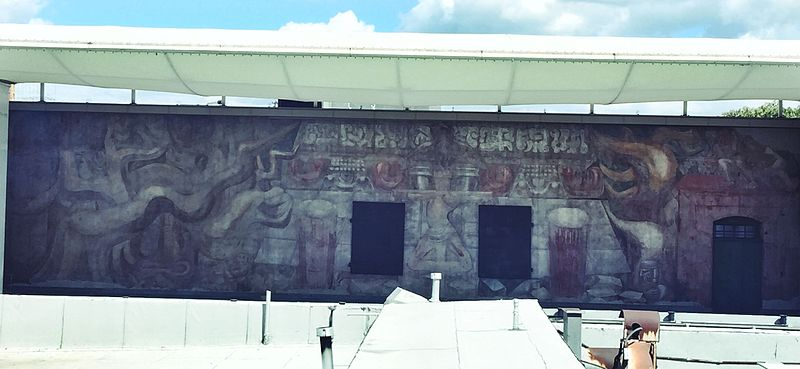
Tropical America

After many years in Mexico and being heavily involved in radical political activities, Siqueiros would face expulsion and relocate to Los Angeles, California in 1932 to continue his career as a muralist. Working in a collective unit that experimented with new painting techniques using modern devices such as airbrushes, spray guns and projectors, Siqueiros and his team of collaborators painted three major murals during his six month stay in Los Angeles. The first, entitled Street Meeting, was commissioned for the Chouinard School of Art. It depicts a group of workers of mixed ethnicities listening to an angry labor agitator's speech during a break in the workday. The mural was washed over within a year of its unveiling – due to weather-related issues, and perhaps the Communist content of the work. Siqueiros' other significant Los Angeles mural, Tropical America (full name: América Tropical: Oprimida y Destrozada por los Imperialismos, or Tropical America: Oppressed and Destroyed by Imperialism), was commissioned shortly after the unveiling of Street Meeting, and was to be painted on the exterior wall of the Plaza Art Center that faced the busy Olvera Street. Tropical America depicts American imperialism in Latin America, a much more radical theme than was intended for the work. Although it received generally favorable criticism, some viewed it as Communist propaganda, which led to a partial covering in 1934 and a total whitewash in 1938. Eighty years later, the Getty Conservation Institute performed restoration work on the mural. As no color photographs of Tropical America are known to exist, conservators used scientific analysis and best practices to get at the artist's vision of the mural. It became accessible to the public on its 80th anniversary, October 9, 2012. The América Tropical Interpretive Center that opened nearby is dedicated to the life and legacy of David Alfaro Siqueiros. The last of the three murals titled Portrait of Mexico Today, which was painted on Director Dudley Murphy's patio in the Pacific Palisades. Siqueiros painted this as a gesture of gratitude to thank Murphy for allowing him to live at his house in Los Angeles and for helping to promote his easel paintings. The mural remained in its location until 2001 when it was donated to the Santa Barbara Museum of Art. It remains one of Siqueiro's most preserved murals from Los Angeles as it was painted for a private residence away from public interaction or interference.

== Artistic career ==
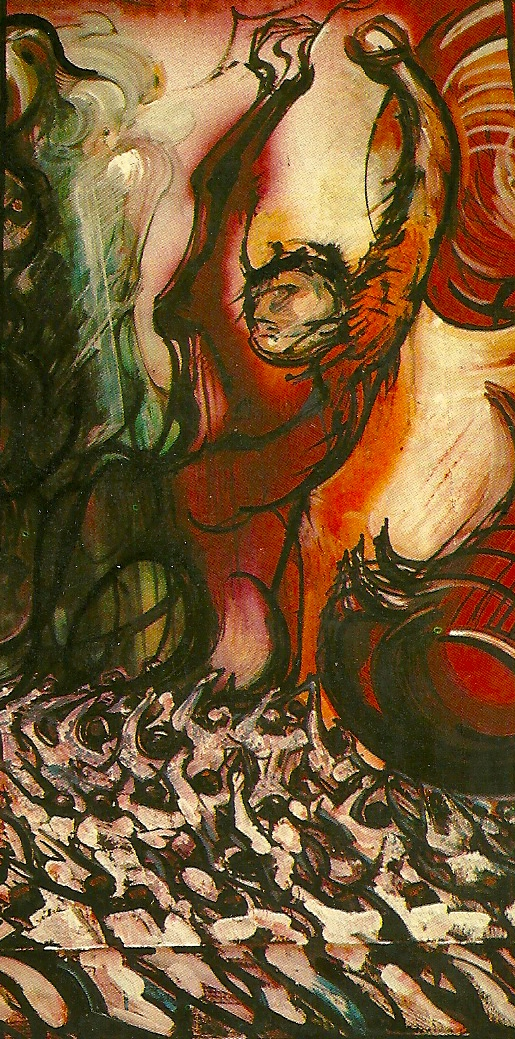
La Marcha de la Humanidad

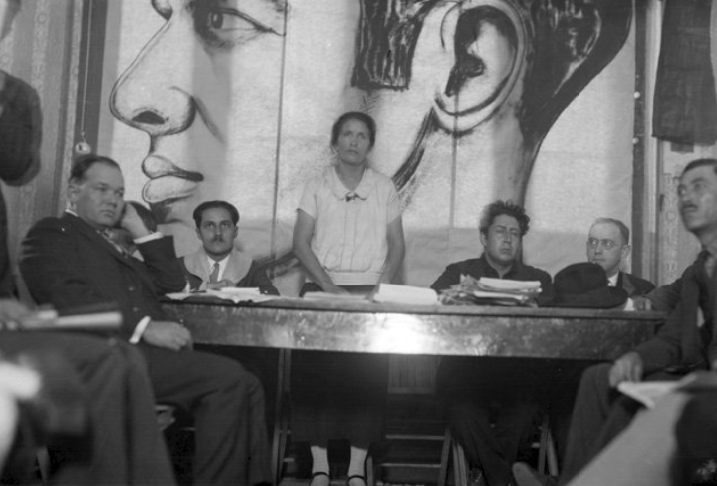
Siqueiros (third from right) along with others during a tribute to Julio Antonio Mella circa 1930

In the early 1930s, including his time spent in Lecumberri Prison, Siqueiros produced a series of politically themed lithographs, many of which were exhibited in the United States. His lithograph Head was shown at the 1930 exhibition "Mexican Artists and Artists of the Mexican School" at The Delphic Studios in New York City. In 1932, he led an exhibition and conference entitled "Rectifications on Mexican Muralism" at the gallery of the Spanish Casino in Taxco, Guerrero. Shortly after, he traveled to New York, where he participated in the Weyhe Gallery's "Mexican Graphic Art" exhibition. Also in 1932, Nelbert Chouinard invited Siqueiros to Los Angeles to conduct mural workshops. It was at this time that, with a team of students, he also completed Tropical America in 1932, at the Italian Hall at Olvera Street in Los Angeles. Painting fresco on an outside wall – visible to passersby as well as intentional viewers – forced Siqueiros to reconsider his methodology as a muralist. He wanted the image – an Indian peon being crucified by American oppression – to be accessible from multiple angles. Instead of just constructing "an enlarged easel painting", he realized that the mural "must conform to the normal transit of a spectator." Eventually, Siqueiros would develop a mural technique that involved tracing figures onto a wall with an electric projector, photographing early wall sketches to improve perspective, and new paints, spray guns, and other tools to accommodate the surface of modern buildings and the outdoor conditions. He was unceremoniously deported from the United States for political activity the same year.

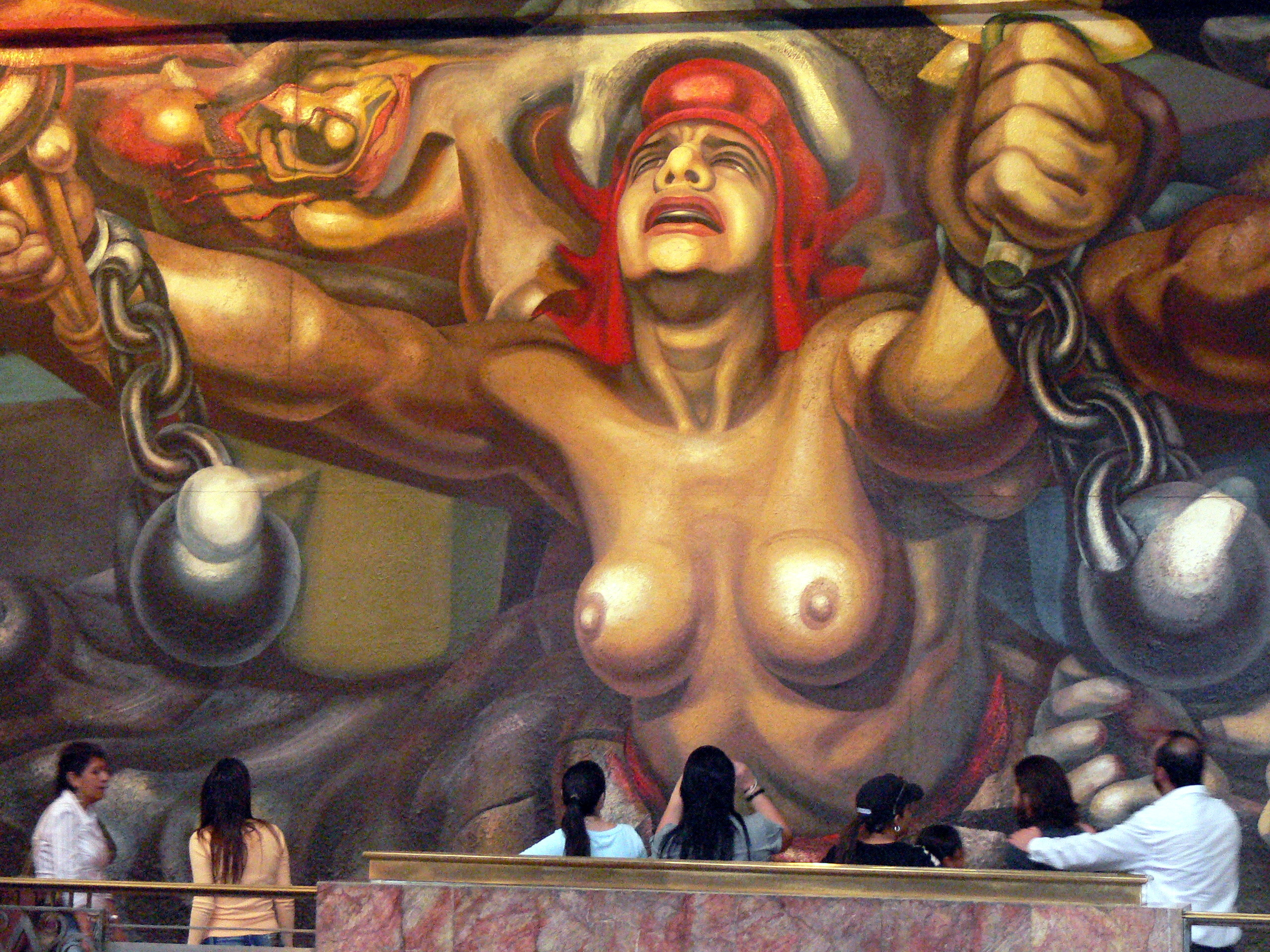
La nueva democracia ("The New Democracy"), 1945, Siqueiros

Back in New York in 1936, he was the guest of honor at the "Contemporary Arts" exhibition at the St. Regis gallery. There he also ran a political art workshop in preparation for the 1936 General Strike for Peace and May Day parade. The young Jackson Pollock attended the workshop and helped build floats for the parade. Siqueiros has been credited with teaching drip and pour techniques to Pollock that later resulted in his all-over paintings, made from 1947 to 1950, and which constitute Pollock's greatest achievement. In addition to floats, the Siqueiros Experimental Workshop produced a variety of posters and other ephemeral works for the CPUSA and other anti-fascist organizations in New York. These ephemeral works possessed the ability to reach the masses in a way different from mural painting because they were accessible to a wide audience outside of an institution or gallery. The Siqueiros Experimental Workshop lasted for only a little over a year until the artist went to fight in the Spanish Civil War in April 1937, but their floats were featured in both the 1936 and 1937 May Day Parades in Manhattan's garment district.

Siqueiros continued to produce several works throughout the late 1930s – such as Echo of a Scream (1937) and The Sob (1939), both now at the Museum of Modern Art in New York. Although he went to Spain to support the Spanish Republic against the fascist forces of Francisco Franco with his art, he volunteered and served in frontline combat as a Lieutenant Colonel in the Army of the Republic through 1938 before returning to Mexico City. After his return, in a stairwell of the Sindicato Mexicano de Electricistas, Siqueiros collaborated with Spanish refugee Josep Renau and the International Team of Plastic Artists to develop one of his most famous works, Portrait of the Bourgeoisie, warning against the dual foes of capitalism and fascism. The original mural, painted in the stairwell of the electrical worker's union, incorporated cameras, photomontage, spray guns, airbrushes, stencils and the latest paints. It shows a giant generator using the opposition of fascist and capitalist democracies to generate imperialism and war. An armed, brave-faced revolutionary, of unnamable class or ethnicity, confronts the machine, and a blue sky on the ceiling flanked by electrical towers displays hope for the proletariat in technological and industrial advances.

American-born poet and eventual fellow Spanish Civil War participant Edwin Rolfe was a great admirer of Siqueiros's "ability to function" as "artist and revolutionary". His 1934 poem "Room with Revolutionists" is based on a conversation between ″New Masses″ editor, poet, and Left journalist Joseph Freeman (1897–1965) and Siqueiros; in it, Siqueiros is described as "a revolutionist / a painter of great areas, editor / of fiery and terrifying words, leader / of the poor who plant, the poor who burrow / under the earth in field and mine. / His life's an always upward-delving battle in / an old torn sweater, the pockets always empty."

== Attempted assassination of Leon Trotsky ==
In 1940, prior to completing the mural for the Mexican Electricians' Union, Siqueiros was forced into hiding and later exiled for his direct involvement in an attempt to assassinate Leon Trotsky, then in exile in Mexico City from the Soviet Union.

President Lázaro Cárdenas had given Leon Trotsky and his wife, Natalia Sedova, political asylum after fleeing Stalinist persecution. They were able to enter the country thanks to the request that Anita Brenner made to Diego Rivera and Frida Kahlo to intervene on their behalf. Trotsky's arrival in Mexico as a political asylee infuriated the Spanish Republicans, allies of the Soviet Union, who complained to the Mexican fighters—among them Siqueiros—about their government's decision to accept Trotsky.

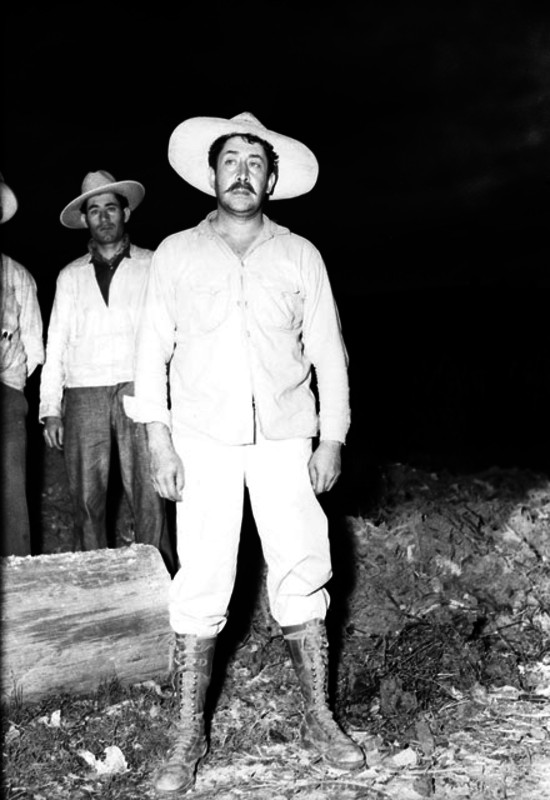
Siqueiros disguised as a farmer under the name of Macario Huízar in the Hostotipaquillo sierra, October 1940

In the early morning of May 24, 1940, [Siqueiros] led an attack on Trotsky's house in Mexico City's Coyoacán suburb. The attacking party was composed of men who had served under Siqueiros in the Spanish Civil War and of miners from his union. After thoroughly raking the house with machine gun fire and explosives, the attackers withdrew in the belief that nobody could have survived the assault. They were mistaken. Trotsky was unhurt and lived till August, when he was killed with an ice axe wielded by an assassin.

Trotsky's 14-year-old grandson was shot, yet survived. Following the attack, police found a shallow grave on the road to the Desierto de los Leones with the body of New York Communist Robert Sheldon Harte, executed by one shot to the head. He had been one of Trotsky's bodyguards. The theory that Sheldon was a Soviet agent who had infiltrated Trotsky's entourage, aiding in Siqueiros's attack by allowing the hit squad to enter Trotsky's compound, was discounted by Trotsky and later historians. Siqueiros's colleague Josep Renau completed the Electricians' Union mural, transforming the generator into a machine that converts the blood of workers into coins.

Siqueiros was located by the police in a property supposedly rented by Angelica and Luis Arenal (Siqueiros's wife and brother-in-law respectively) in the outskirts of the capital. Siqueiros fled to Guadalajara, hiding in the house of his old friend José Guadalupe Zuno and from there he moved to the mountain town of Hostotipaquillo. Together with Angélia Arenal, he hid disguised as a peasant under the name of Macario Huízar. The Jalisco police apprehended Siqueiros and he was taken back Mexico City. He was formally processed and declared prisoner in the Lecumberri Preventive Prison. Siqueiros was charged for attempted homicide, criminal association, improper use of uniform, usurpation of functions, breaking and entering, firing a firearm and robbery.

Despite Siqueiros's participation in these events, he never stood trial and was given permission to leave the country to paint a mural in Chile, arranged by Chilean poet Pablo Neruda. In a school library in the town of Chillán, he organized a team of artists to paint a mural which combined the heroic figures of Mexico and Chile in "Death to the Invader."

Hoping to revisit the United States and contribute to the struggle against fascism, he was denied entry and went to Cuba where he painted three murals, "Allegory of Racial Equality and Fraternity in Cuba," "New Day of the Democracies" and "Two Mountains of America, Marti and Lincoln."

== Later life and works ==
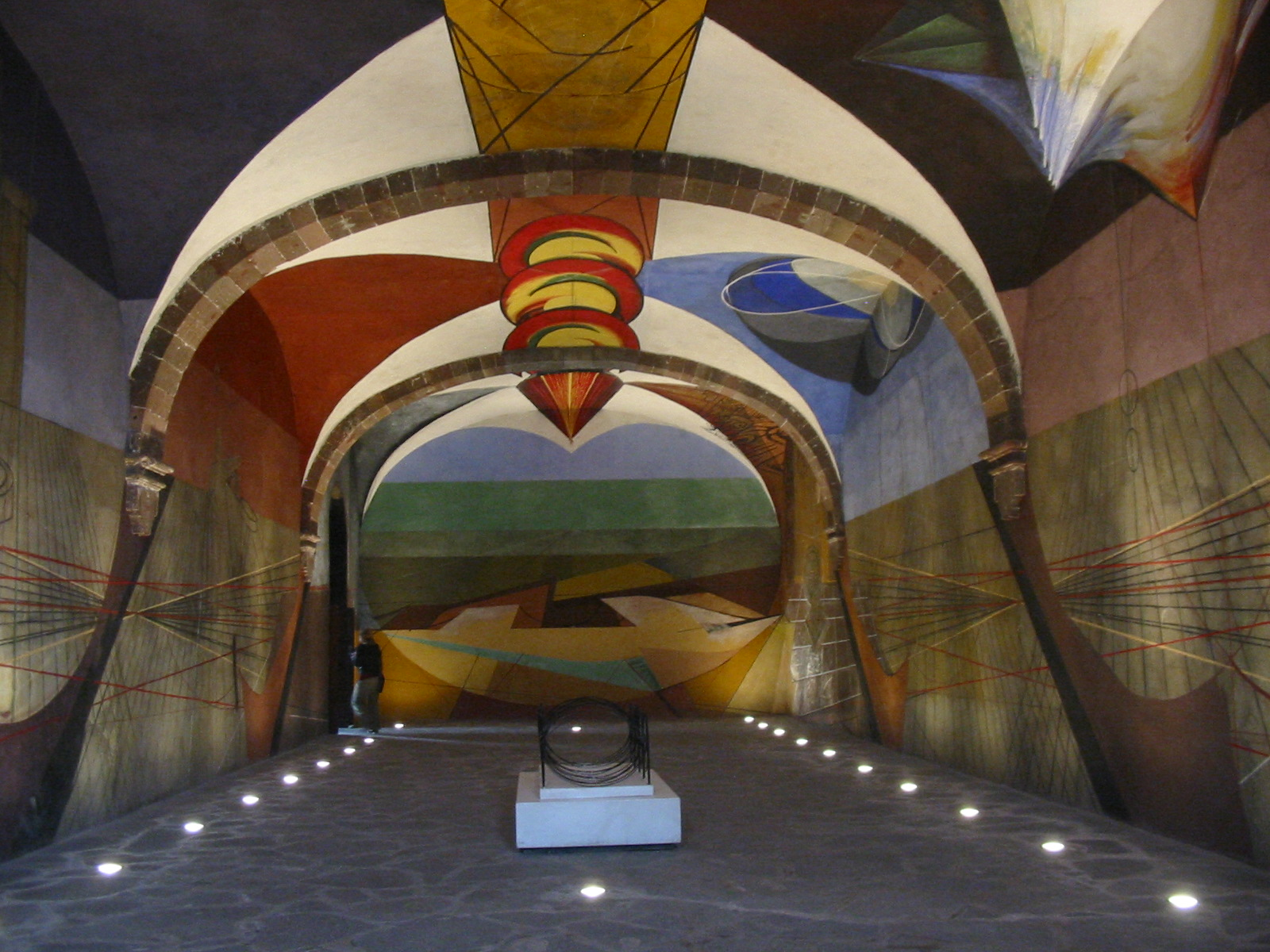
Unfinished 1940s mural painted by David Alfaro Siqueiros, in Escuela de Bellas Artes, a cultural center in San Miguel de Allende, Gto.

In 1948, Siqueiros was invited to teach a course on mural painting at an art academy in San Miguel Allende. Although he was barred from the United States, most of the students were American GIs who were being paid to study under him. Practicing his idea of learning art by working with a master artist on a mural project, he planned a mural in a colonial building recognizing the legacy of Ignacio Allende, one of Mexico's leaders of the struggle for independence. The mural was never completed, due to legal procedures against the owner of the art academy. Based on this experience, he later wrote a book titled Cómo se pinta un mural.

Siqueiros participated in the first ever Mexican contingent at the XXV Venice Biennale exhibition with Orozco, Rivera and Tamayo in 1950, and he received the second prize for all exhibitors, which recognized the international status of Mexican art. Yet by the 1950s, Siqueiros returned to accepting commissions from what he considered a "progressive" Mexican state, rather than painting for galleries or private patrons. He constructed an outdoor mural entitled The People to the University, the University to the People at the National Autonomous University of Mexico in Mexico City in 1952. It was a combination of mural painting, bas-relief sculpture and Italian mosaic. In 1957 he began work on 4,500-square-foot (420 m^{2}) government commission for Chapultepec Castle in Mexico City; Del porfirismo a la Revolución was his biggest mural yet. (The painting is known in English as From the Dictatorship of Porfirio Diaz to the Revolution or The Revolution Against the Porfirian Dictatorship.)

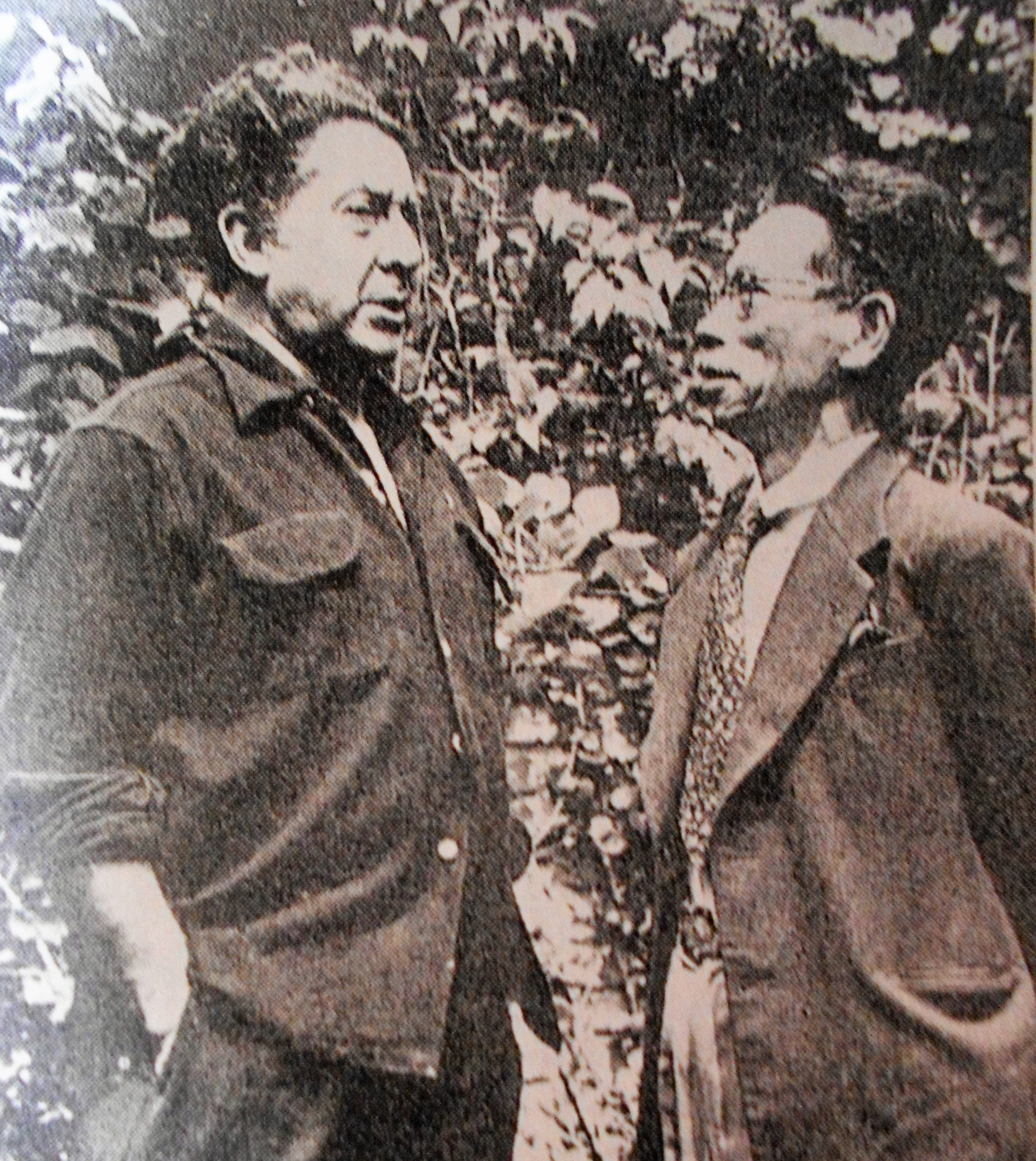
Siqueiros with Tamiji Kitagawa in 1955

In the lobby of the Hospital de la Raza in Mexico City, he created a revolutionary multi-angular mural using new materials and techniques, For the Social Welfare of all Mexicans. After painting Man the Master and Not the Slave of Technology on a concave aluminum panel in the lobby of the Polytechnic Institute, he painted The Apology for the Future Victory of Science over Cancer on panels that wrap around the lobby of the cancer center.

Yet near the end of the decade, his outspoken communist views alienated him from the government. Under pressure from the government, the National Actors' Association, which had commissioned a mural on the theater in Mexico suspended his work on The History of Theater in Mexico at the Jorge Negrete Theater and sued him for breach of contract in 1958.

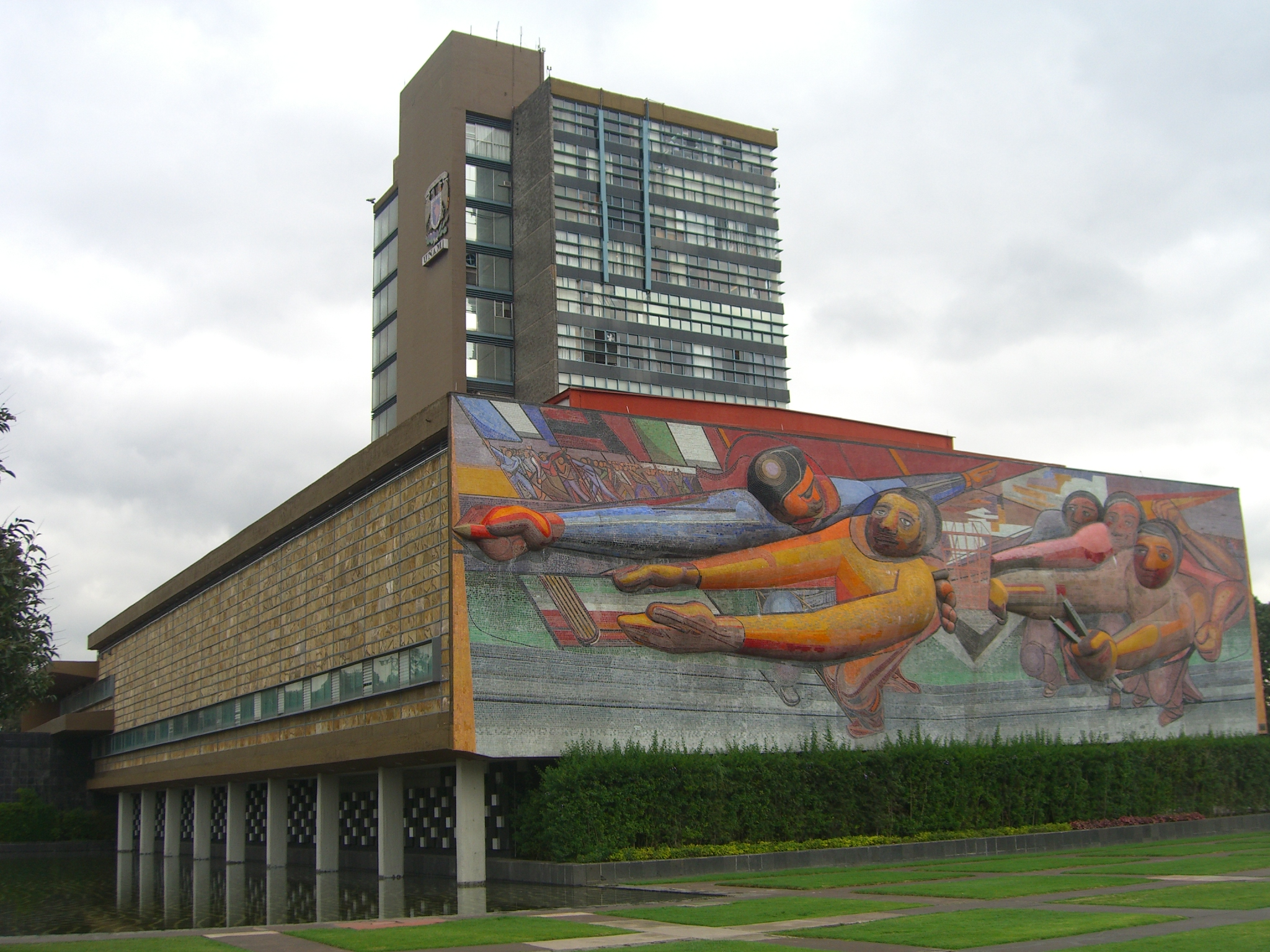
David Siqueiros mural: El pueblo a la universidad, la universidad al pueblo, National Autonomous University of Mexico, 1952–1956

Siqueiros was eventually arrested in 1960 for openly criticizing the President of Mexico, Adolfo López Mateos, and leading protests against the arrests of striking workers and teachers, though the charges were commonly known to be false. Numerous protests ensued, even including an appeal advertisement by well-known artists and writers in The New York Times in 1961. Unjustly imprisoned, Siqueiros continued to paint, and his works continued to sell. During that stay, he would make numerous sketches for the project of decorating the Hotel Casino de la Selva, owned by Manuel Suarez y Suarez. After international pressure was put on the Mexican authorities, Siqueiros was finally pardoned and released in the spring of 1964. He immediately resumed working on his suspended murals in the Actors' Union and Chapultepec Castle.

When the mural planned for the Hotel de la Selva in Cuernavaca was moved to Mexico City and expanded, he assembled a team of national and international artists to work on the panels in his workshop in Cuernavaca. This project, his last major mural, is the largest mural ever painted, an integrated structure combining architecture, in which the building was designed as a mural, with mural painting and polychromed sculpture. Known as the Polyforum Siqueiros, the exterior consists of 12 panels of sculpture and painting while the walls and ceiling of the interior are covered with The March of Humanity on Earth and Toward the Cosmos. Completed in 1971 after years of extension and delay, the mural broke from some previous stylistic mandates, if only by its complex message. From a muralist known for making art that was easily read by the public, especially the lower classes, Siqueiros' message in The March is more difficult to decipher, though it seems to fuse two visions of human progress, one international and one based in Mexican heritage. The mural's placement at a ritzy hotel and commission by its millionaire owner also seems to challenge Siqueiros' anti-capitalist ideology.

== Global policy ==
Siqueiros was one of the signatories of the agreement to convene a convention for drafting a world constitution. As a result, for the first time in human history, a World Constituent Assembly convened to draft and adopt a Constitution for the Federation of Earth.

== Death ==
Siqueiros died in Cuernavaca, Morelos, on January 6, 1974, in the company of Angélica Arenal Bastar (1909-1989), who had been his partner since the Spanish Civil War. His remains were interred at the Rotunda of Illustrious Persons. A few days before his death, he donated his house in Polanco to the Mexican state; since 1969, it had been used for Public Art Rooms and a Museum of Mural Painting Composition.

== Style ==
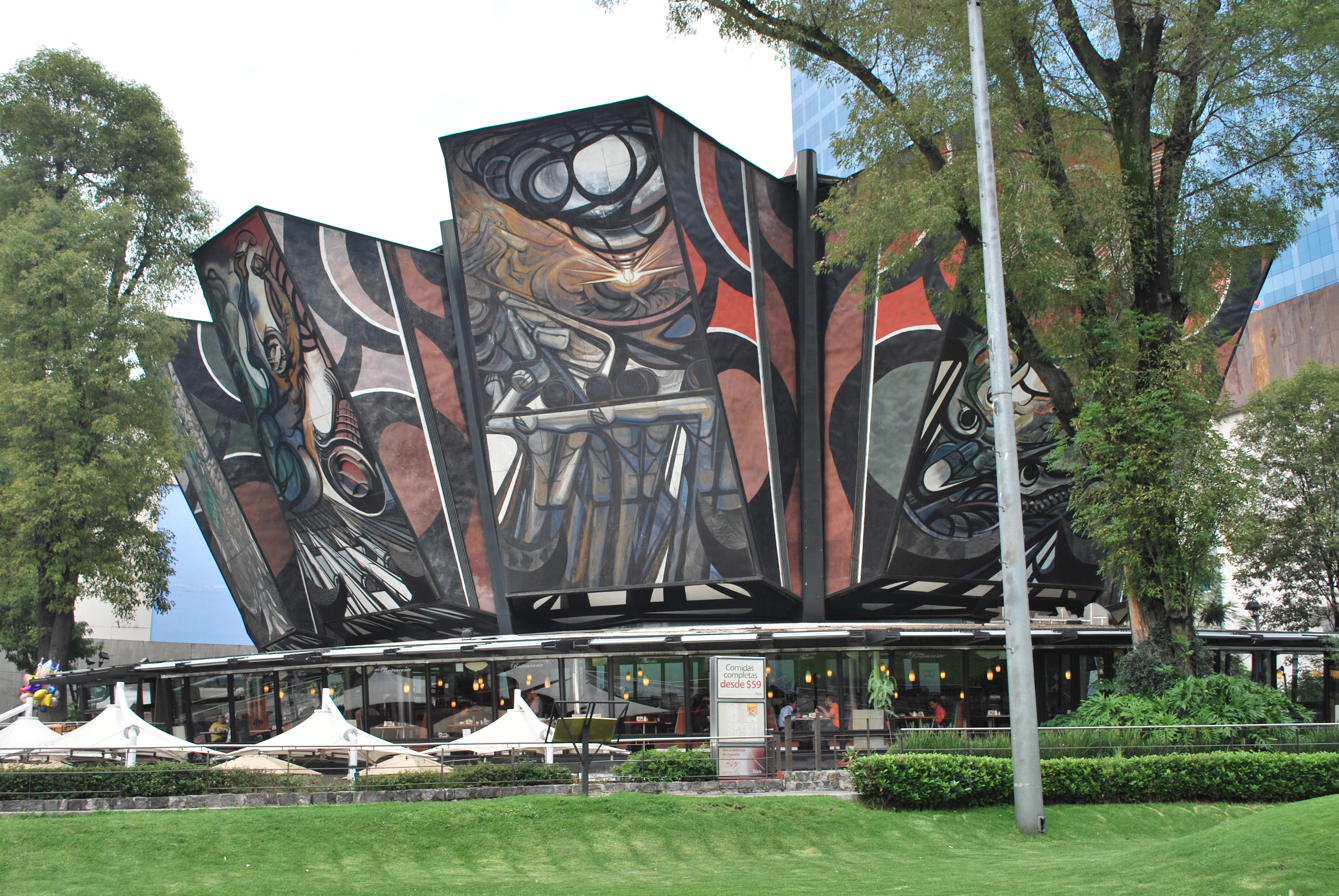
View of the Polyforum Cultural Siqueiros in Mexico City

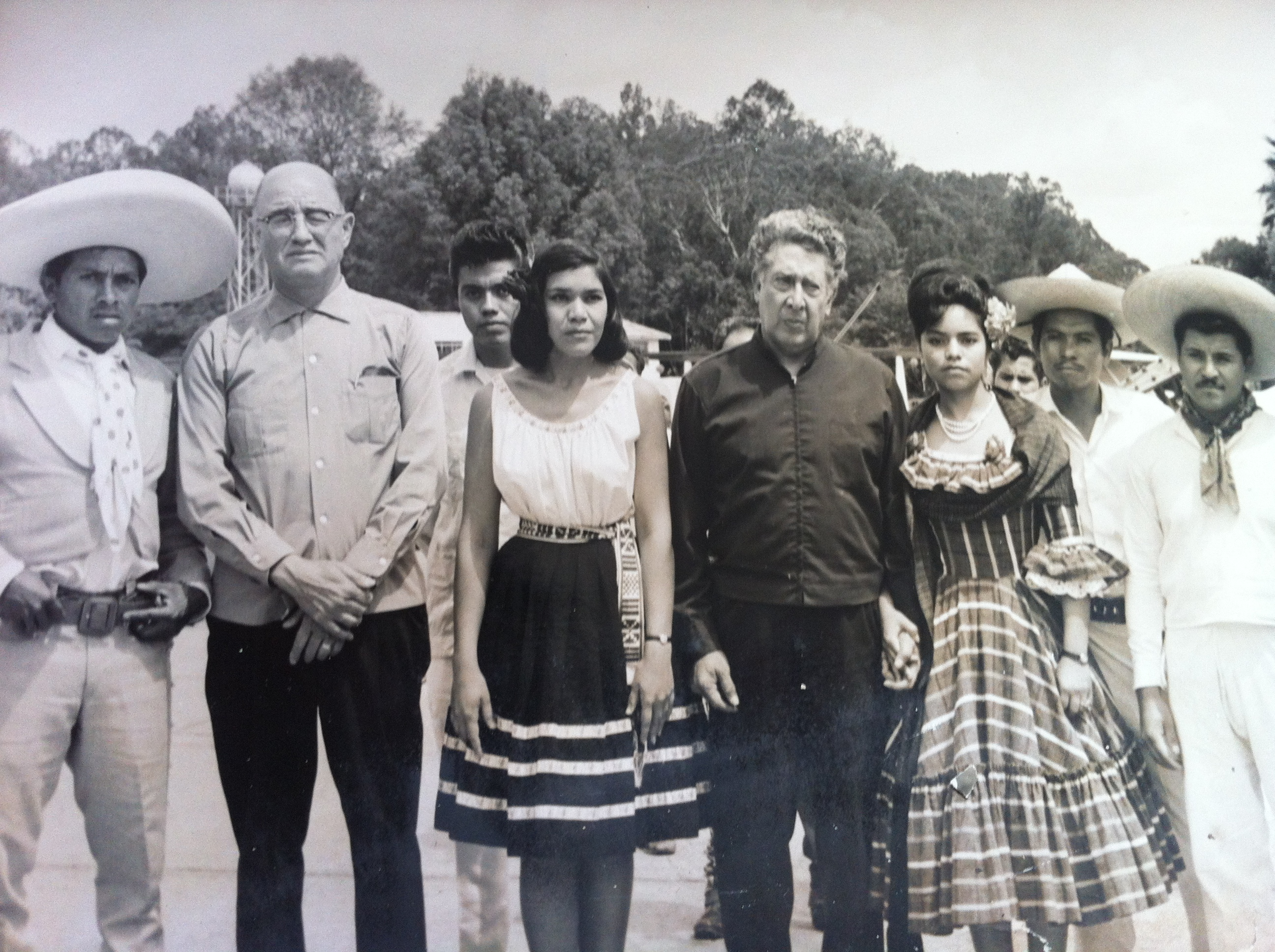
Manuel Suárez y Suárez and Siqueiros

As a muralist and an artist, Siqueiros believed art should be public, educational, and ideological. He painted mostly murals and other portraits of the revolution – its goals, its past, and the current oppression of the working classes. Because he was painting a story of human struggle to overcome authoritarianism, capitalist rule, he painted the everyday people ideally involved in this struggle. Though his pieces sometimes include landscapes or figures of Mexican history and mythology, these elements often appear as mere accessories to the story of a revolutionary hero or heroes (several works depict the revolutionary "masses", such as the mural at Chapultepec).

His interest in the human form developed at the Academy in Mexico City. His accentuation of the angles of the body, its muscles and joints, can be seen throughout his career in his portrayal of the strong revolutionary body. In addition, many works, especially in the 1930s, prominently feature hands, which could be interpreted as another heroic symbol of proletarian strength through work: his self-portrait in prison (El Coronelazo, 1945, Museum of Modern Art, Mexico City), Our Present Image (1947, Museum of Modern Art, Mexico), New Democracy (1944, Palace of Fine Arts, Mexico City), and even his series on working class women, such as The Sob.

== Gallery ==
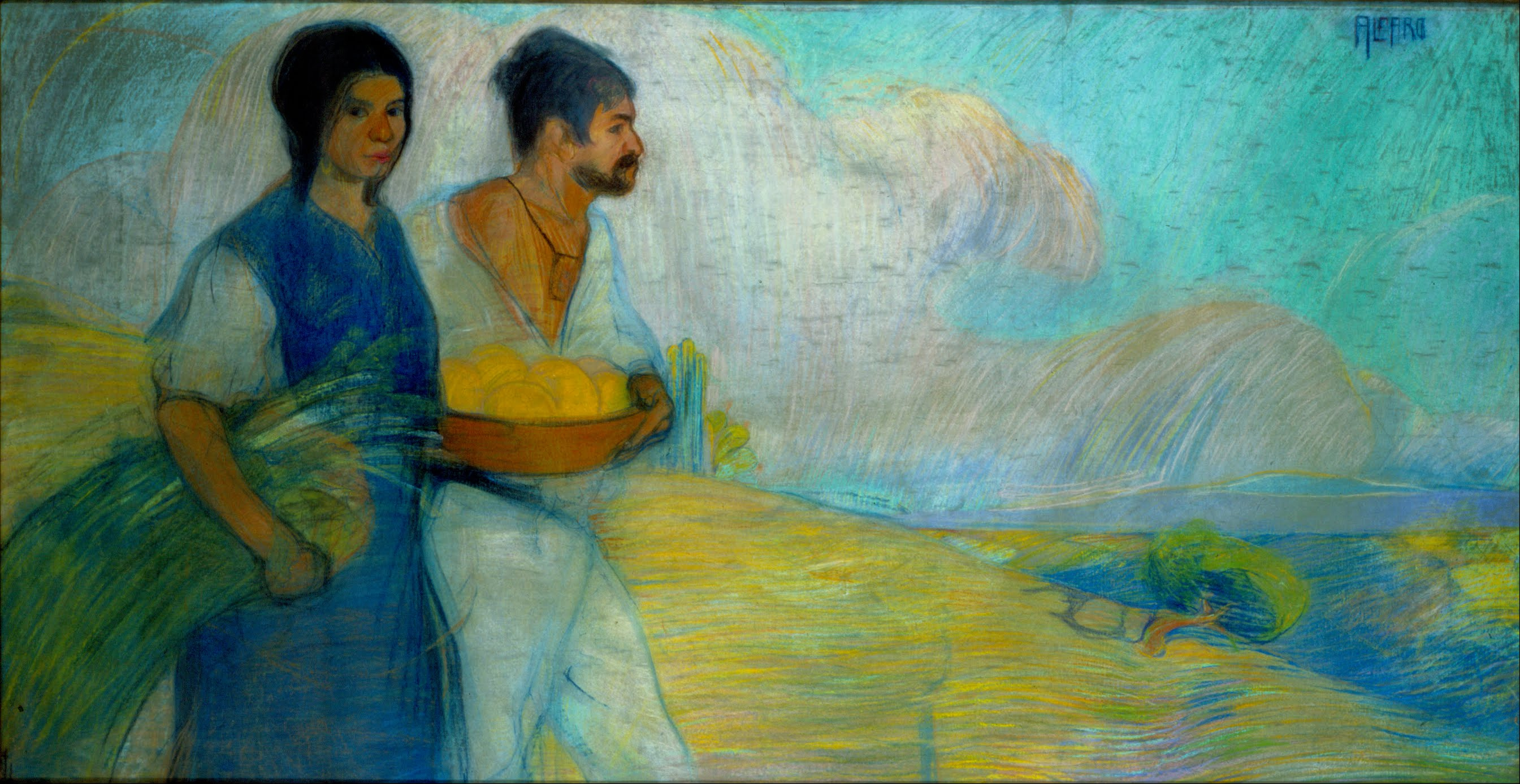
Peasants (c. 1913)

Portrait of Carlos Orozco Romero, 1918

El señor del veneno, 1918

Portrait of Amado de la Cueva, 1920

The Elements, 1922

Madre campesina, 1924

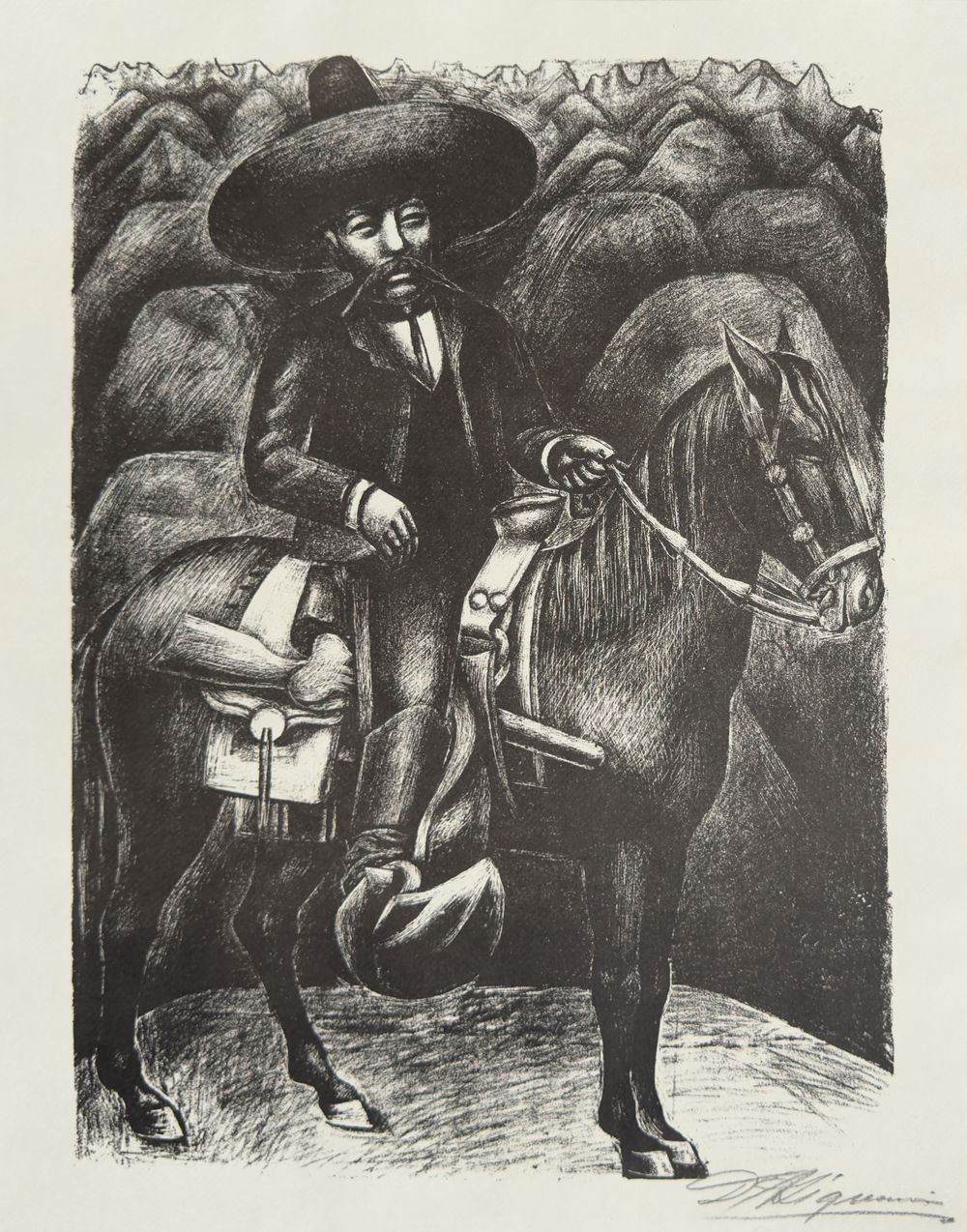
Zapata, 1930

Madre proletaria, 1931

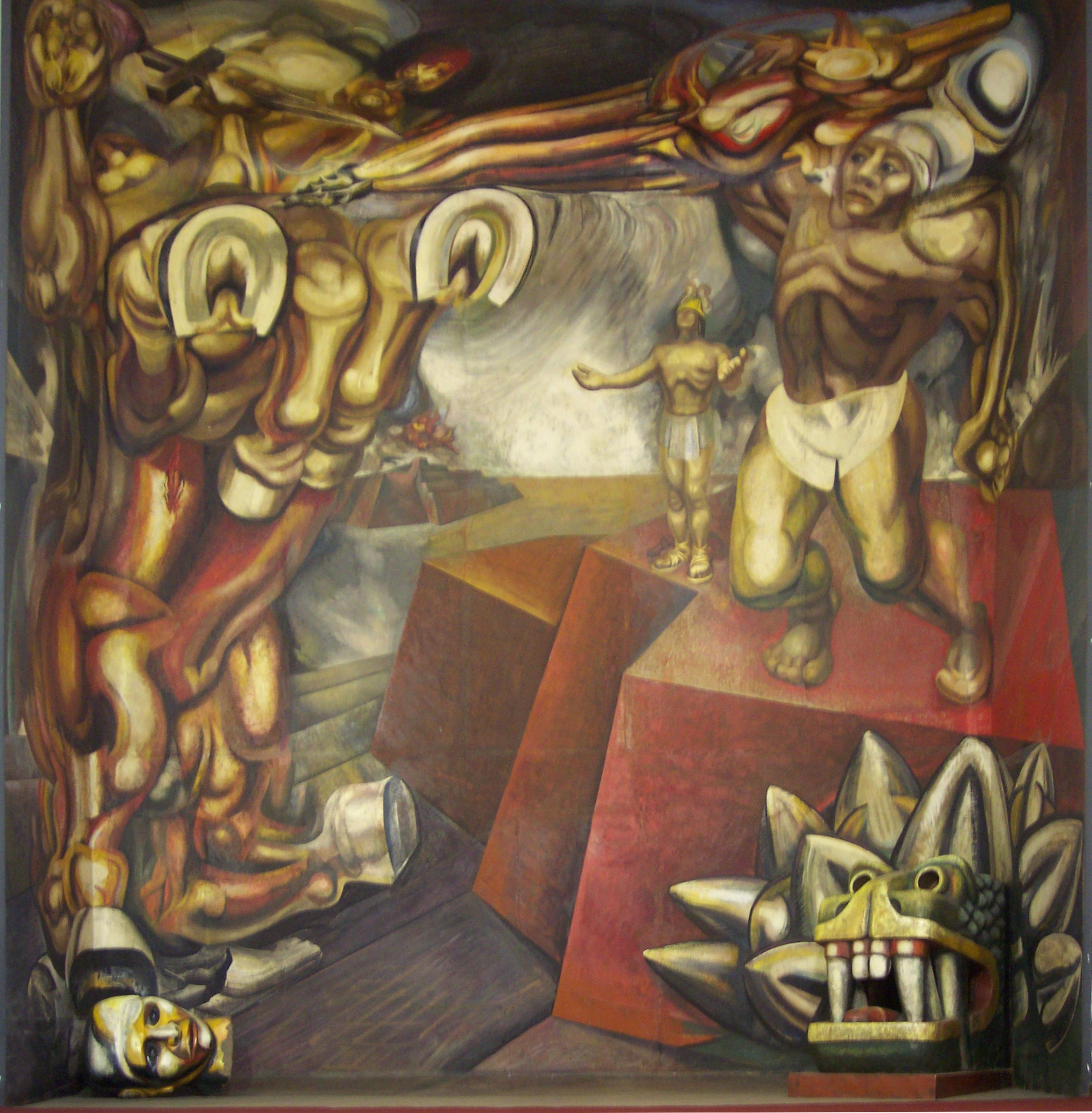
Mural by David Alfaro Siqueiros in Tecpan, c. 1944

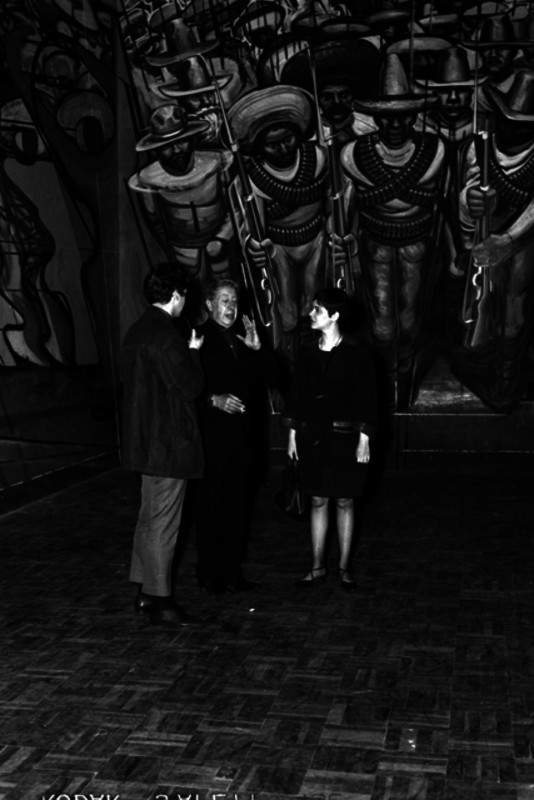
David Alfaro Siqueiros with other people at the Chapultepec Castle, 1960

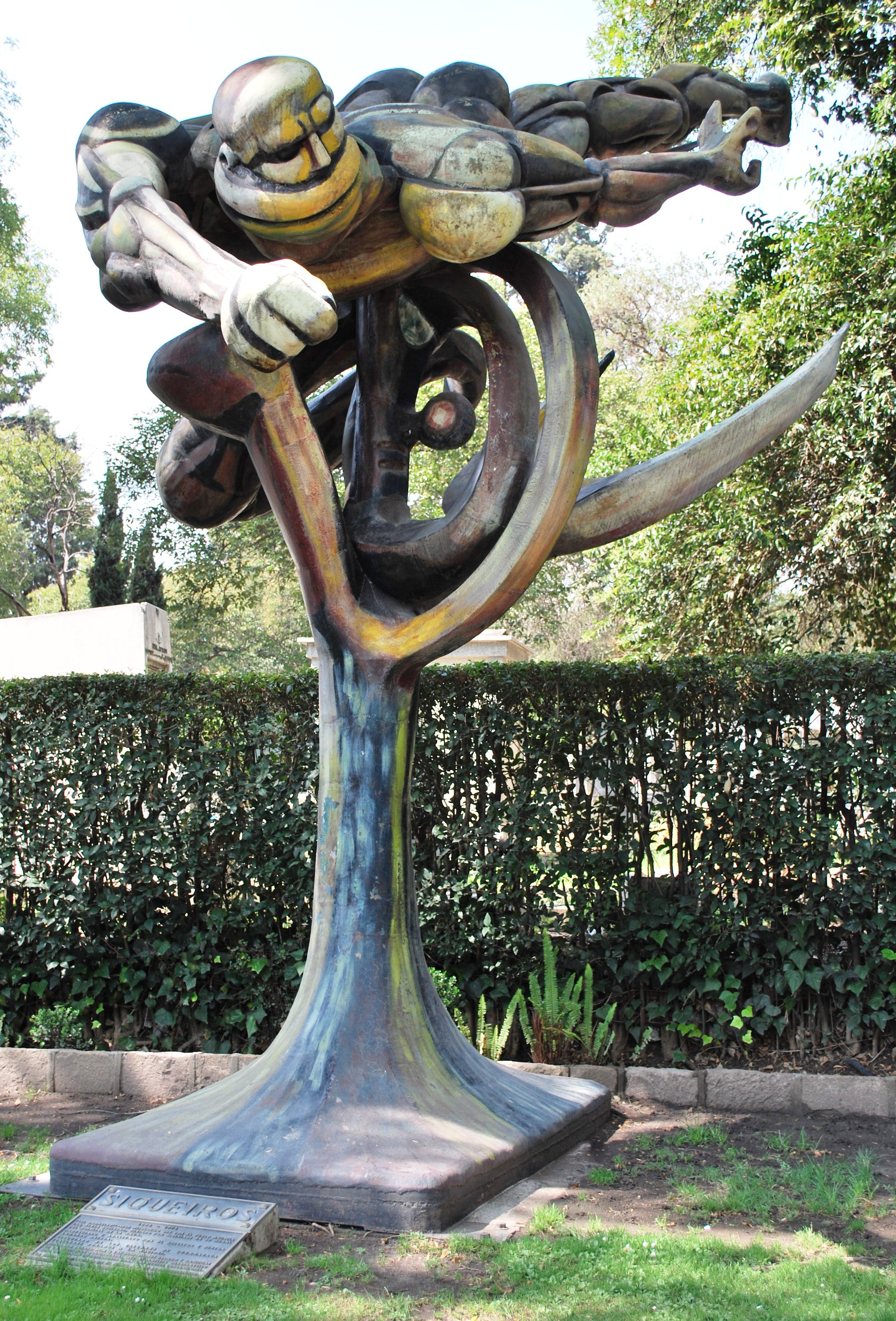
Tomb of David Alfaro Siqueiros in Panteón de Dolores

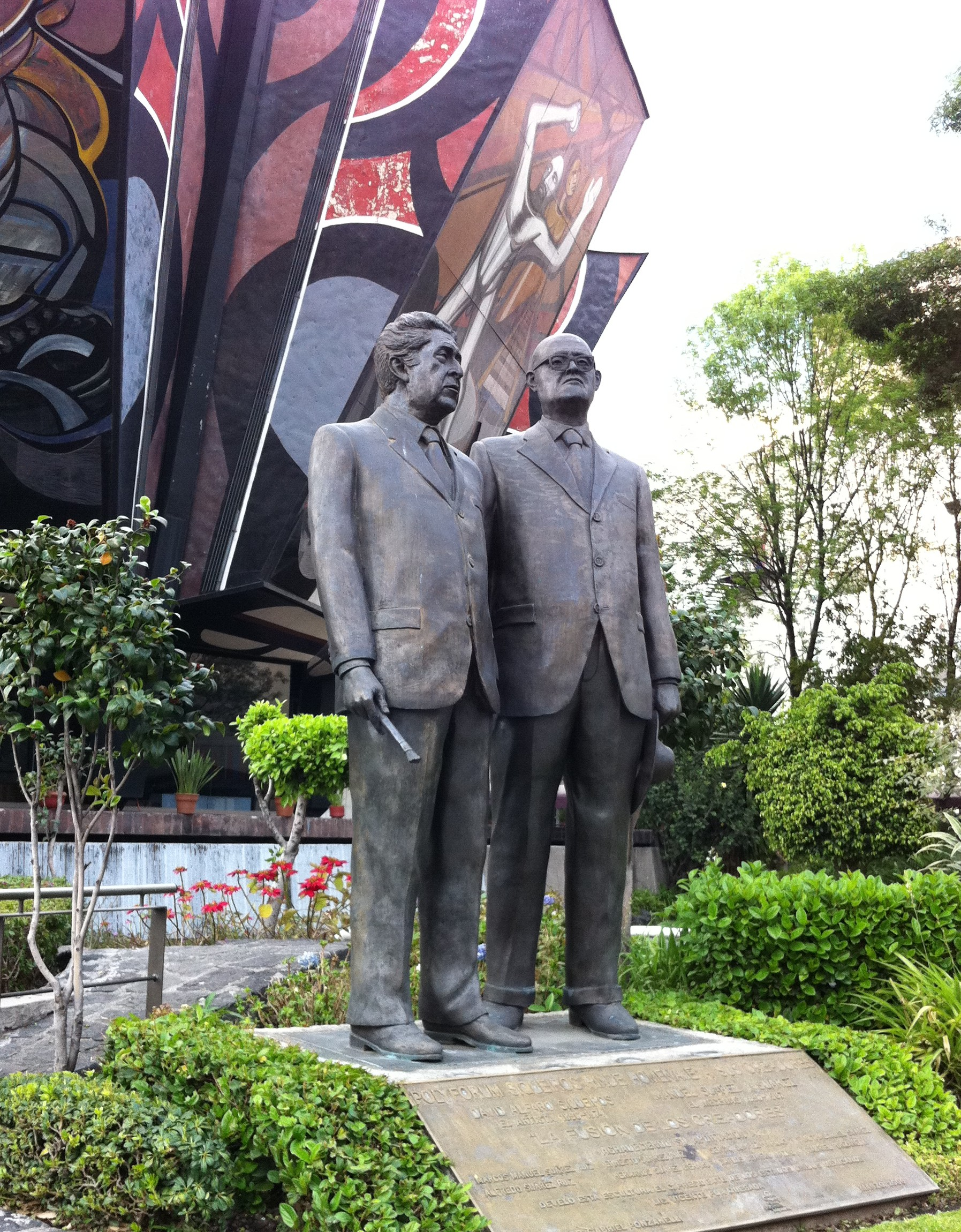
Escultura Don Manuel Suarez and Siqueiros

== Major exhibitions ==
- Siqueiros, at Casino Español, Mexico City, 1932.
- 70 Recent Works from David Alfaro Siqueiros, at the Museo Nacional de Artes Plásticas, Mexico City, 1947.
- Siqueiros, at Galeria de Arte Mexicano, Mexico City, 1953.
- Siqueiros: Retrospective Exhibition 1911–1967, at the Museo Universitario de Ciencas y Arte, Mexico City, 1967.
- Siqueiros-Exposición Retrospectiva, at the Tokyo National Museum, Tokyo, 1972.
- Siqueiros: Exposción de Homenaje, at the Instituto Nacional de Bellas Artes, Mexico City, 1975.
- Siqueiros-Visión, Tecnica y Estructural, at the Instituto Nacional de Bellas Artes, Mexico City, 1984.
- Images of Mexico, at the Dallas Museum of Art, Dallas, 1988.
- Latin American Artists of the Twentieth Century, at the Museum of Modern Art, New York, 1993.
- Vida Americana: Mexican Muralists Remake American Art 1925–1945, at the Whitney Museum of American Art, New York, 2020.

== See also ==
- Mexican muralism
- Mexican art
- Museo Cabeza de Juárez
- La Tallera
- List of people from Morelos

== Selected other works ==
- Proletarian Mother, 1929, Museum of Modern Art, Mexico
- Zapata (lithograph), 1930, Tehran Museum of Contemporary Art
- Zapata (oil painting), 1931, Hirshhorn Museum and Sculpture Garden, Smithsonian, Washington, D.C.
- América Tropical, 1932, Los Angeles
- War, 1939, Philadelphia Museum of Art
- José Clemente Orozco, 1947, Carrillo Gil Museum, Mexico City
- Cain in the United States, 1947, Carrillo Gil Museum, Mexico city
- For Complete Social Security of All Mexicans, 1953–36, Hospital de La Raza, Mexico City
