= Traditional Mexican handcrafted toys =

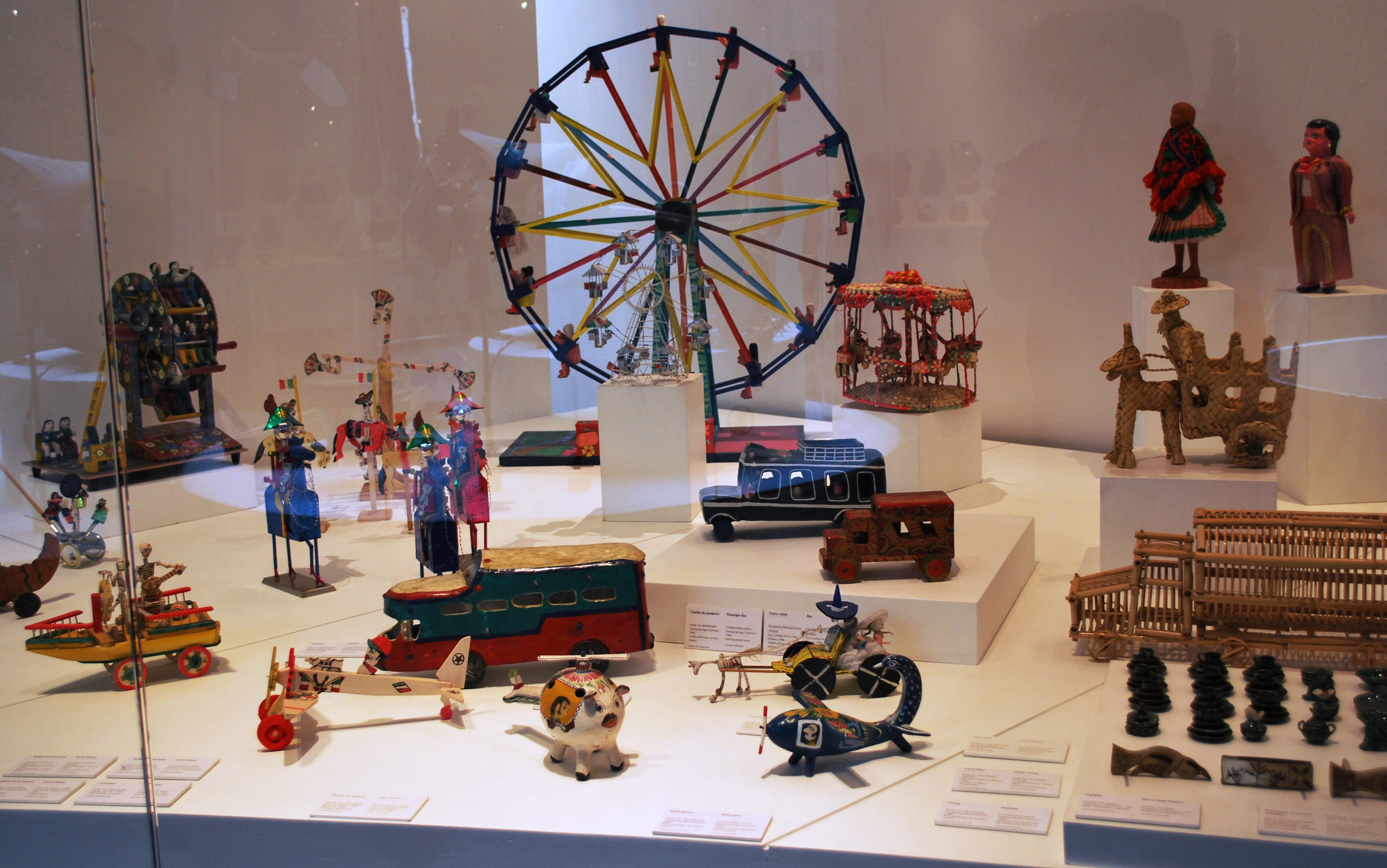
Display of traditional toys at the Museo de Arte Popular in Mexico City

Traditional Mexican handcrafted toys are those made by artisans rather than manufactured in factories. The history of Mexican toys extends as far back as the Mesoamerican era, but many of the toys date to the colonial period. Many of these were introduced as teaching tools by evangelists, and were associated with certain festivals and holidays. These toys vary widely, including cup and ball, lotería, dolls, miniature people, animals and objects, tops and more—made of many materials, including wood, metal, cloth, corn husks, ceramic, and glass. These toys remained popular throughout Mexico until the mid-20th century, when commercially made, mostly plastic toys became widely available. Because of the advertising commercial toys receive and because they are cheaper, most traditional toys that are sold as handcrafts, principally to tourists and collectors.

== History ==
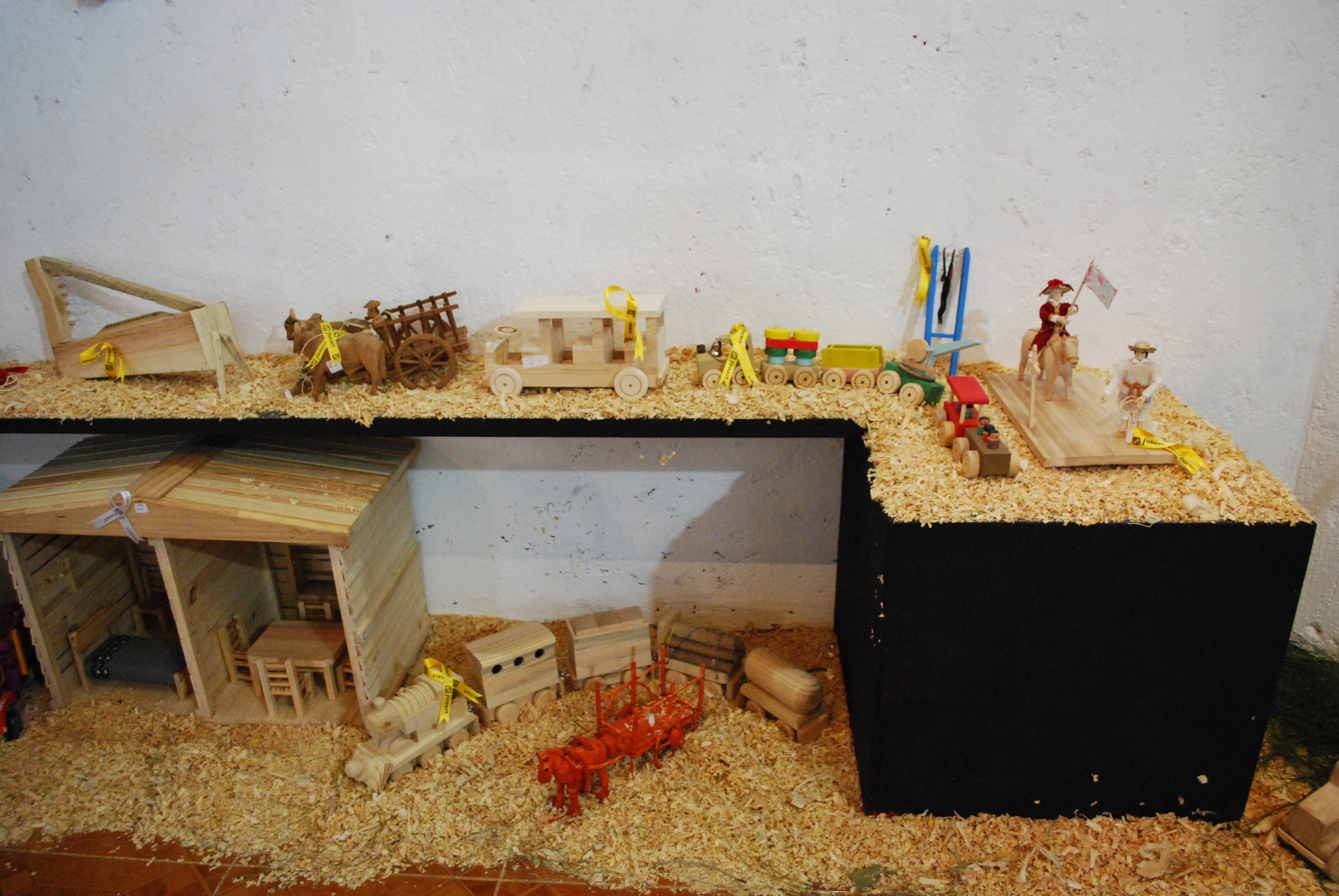
Display of wood toys at the Museo de las Culturas Populares de Chiapas in San Cristobal de las Casas

The origin of toys in what is now Mexico is not clear, but the oldest are considered the ball, dolls, and toy animals. There have been finds of what may have been toys from the Mesoamerican period, including ceramic figures of dogs and jaguars with wheels at Olmec sites, a musical instrument called a sonaja, whistles and dolls with movable arms and legs. Multiple possible ceramic toys have been found at Zapotec sites including small and medium sizes dolls and toy animals. These dolls are called Tonka or Tangu-yu in Zapotec. Some of these dolls carry a child on their shoulders or a basket with food on their heads. Animal figures include deer, monkeys, coyotes. Modified versions of these are still made today. However, since these have been found at grave sites, they may have had ritual purpose instead of recreational. According to the Codex Mendoza, Aztec games for children were geared towards incorporating them into society and many imitated adult activities. Toys included smaller versions of tools, with boys receiving weapons and agricultural implements and girls receiving those used for domestic chores. One known game from the Aztec period is cocoyocpatolli ("hole game"). A hole is created and from a certain distance, children competed tossing small stones or fruit pits into it. Another is chichinadas, from the word meaning to hit, and very similar to marbles. Mapepenas (“hand catch”) is a game, where a stone of a certain color is chosen, with more hidden on a mat. The winner is the first to get another stone of the same color.

Many of Mexico's traditional toys have their origins in the colonial period, when new crafts and European style playthings were introduced by missionaries. As they were often part of the evangelization process in the early colonial period, a number of toys became associated with religious celebrations. One examples are wood and bone ratchets made for Holy Week and generally given to children. Other important days with toys associated with them include Carnival, Corpus Christi, Las Posadas, Day of the Dead and various saints’ days. On Corpus Christi, toys called tarascas were sold. These were winged dragons made of wood with wheels sold outside churches. The toy is related to a medieval legend to this creature that ate maidens and of the knight that slayed it. Other toys related to this day included small burros made with corn husks, decorated with paper flowers. June 24 is the feast of John the Baptist, once celebrated by children with turbans and swords made of cartonería and wood. For the feast of Anthony the Great, small cages with crepe paper birds were popular and sold outside of churches, but this tradition has disappeared. Oriental influence on the toys later came from trade through Manila Galleon .

From the colonial period into the 19th and early 20th century, traditional handcrafted toys could be found all over Mexico, generally sold at tianguis markets, other traditional markets and stands set up for festivals, especially in larger cities such as Mexico City . After Mexico’s Independence, European toys became very fashionable, especially cloth-bodied dolls with porcelain heads and hands. However, these were very expensive, which prompted locally made imitations that eventually took on a Mexican character. Other popular toys included dollhouses with furniture, tea sets, wooden horses, puppets, rope tied into human or animal shapes—and toy trains made of wood, sheet metal and cartonería. Another important category from the colonial period to the present have been miniatures, with those of painted clay and wire extremely common in all parts of Mexico up to the mid 20th century. Until this time, they were played with by generations of Mexican children, reaching their greatest popularity in the rural areas of the country. Since the 1970s, they have almost entirely been replaced by plastic, commercial toys, due to children’s interest in commercial toys, especially electronic ones.

The making of traditional toys in Mexico has been disappearing, especially since the 1970s. Many are still made but most are sold to tourists and to collectors. The toys are considered an important aspect of traditional Mexican culture as well as a source of income for various craftsmen. For example, the Terán Market in Aguascalientes is home to the Zabalas family, which has sold handcrafted toys for over twenty years, brought from places such as Michoacán, Jalisco and Guanajuato. Supporters of the toys state that their demise is problematic for the culture as they are being replaced by violent videogames. However, most children of toymakers and toy sellers have little interest in continuing the tradition.

Mexican handcraft proponents such as FONART continue to promote and support the making and sale of traditional toys. Most are now owned by and made for by these organizations as well as individual collectors both in Mexico and abroad. In Mexico, museums dedicated to these toys include the Museo del Juguete Popular Mexicano (La Esquina) in San Miguel de Allende and he Museo del Juguete Antiguo México in Colonia Doctores . The Museo de Juguete Tradicional Mexicano in Aguascalientes has over a thousand pieces in its collection. Other museums and organizations have held temporary exhibits dedicated to the toys. One was called 'Había un navío, navío cargado de... Juegos y juguetes tradicionales de la Independencia y Revolución Mexicana', which displayed over 600 pieces in Guadalajara . Another was held by the Franz Mayer Museum in Mexico City, which featured toys from fourteen different collections, ten of which were to private individuals. One important private collection is part of the Rockefeller Mexican handcraft collection. This collection of toys is large and varied including pull toys (also called trundle toys) from the 1920s and 1930s, earthenware animal bands from the 1970s, miniature bullfighting scenes, animal banks, puppets and papier-mâché and rag dolls. Of central importance is a set of articulated conchero pull toys made in the 1930s. These lively performers have faces of clay and torsos and limbs of wood, cardboard, feathers, fur and tinfoil. The instruments they play are bottle caps. Although the provenance of this group is uncertain, similar examples were made and sold in San Juan de los Lagos, Jalisco and Salamanca, Guanajuato, some decades ago as well as Oaxaca . The collection contains an important whistle figure from Ocumicho, Michoacán in the form of a devil-animal, one of the oldest surviving examples of its kind. The collection includes a set of clay toys made by artisan Aurelio Flores of Izucar de Matamoros, Puebla, which is known for its Trees of Life. However, clay figures of men, women, horses and more have almost completely disappeared from this town. Even rarer are figures painted with natural varnishes and colors made from materials such as prickly pear juice and tree resin as these are.

The toys are also prized by many of Mexican heritage in the United States. There are efforts to promote the toys for identity purposes to these communities in areas such as Arizona .

== Types of toys ==
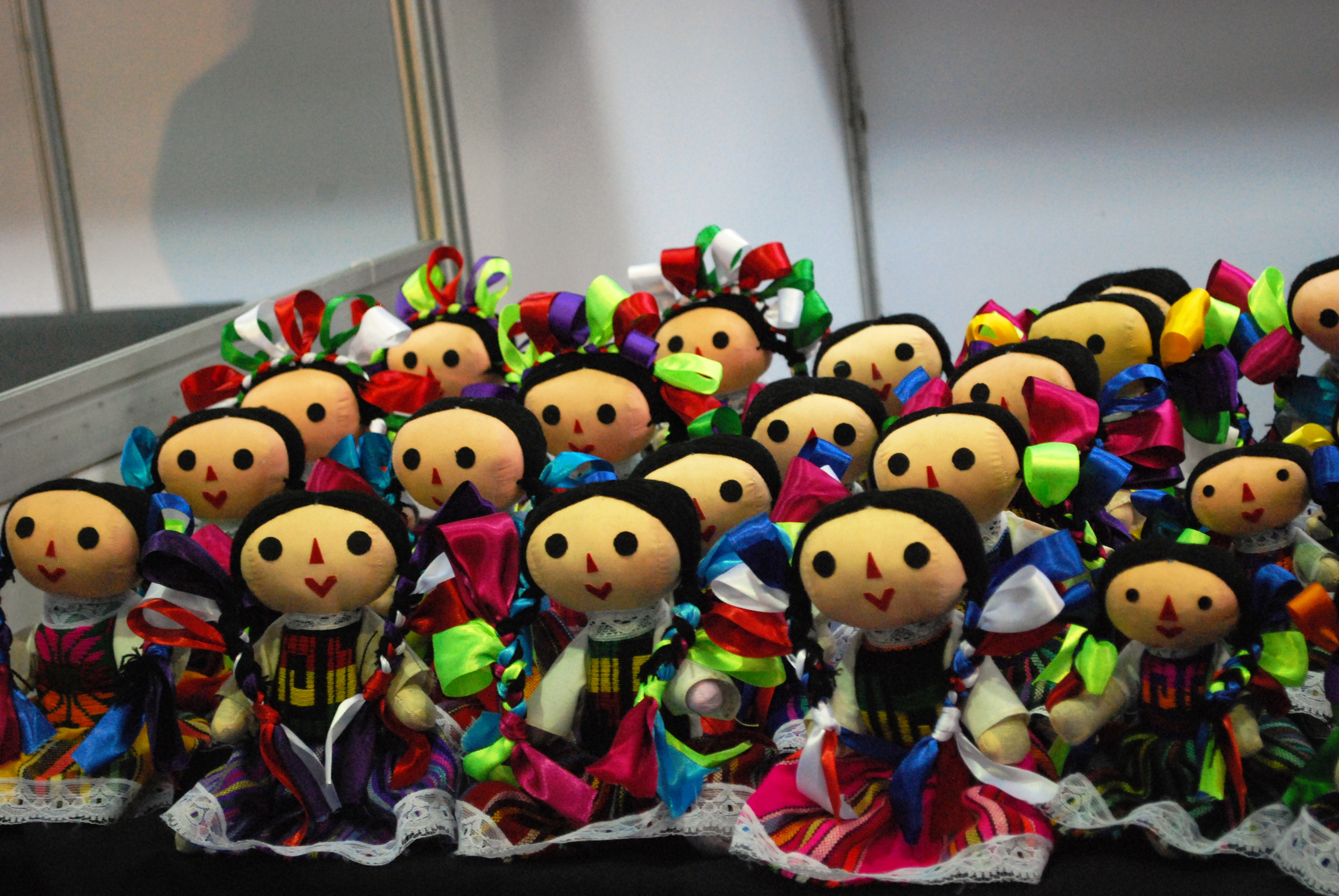
Oaxacan style rag dolls

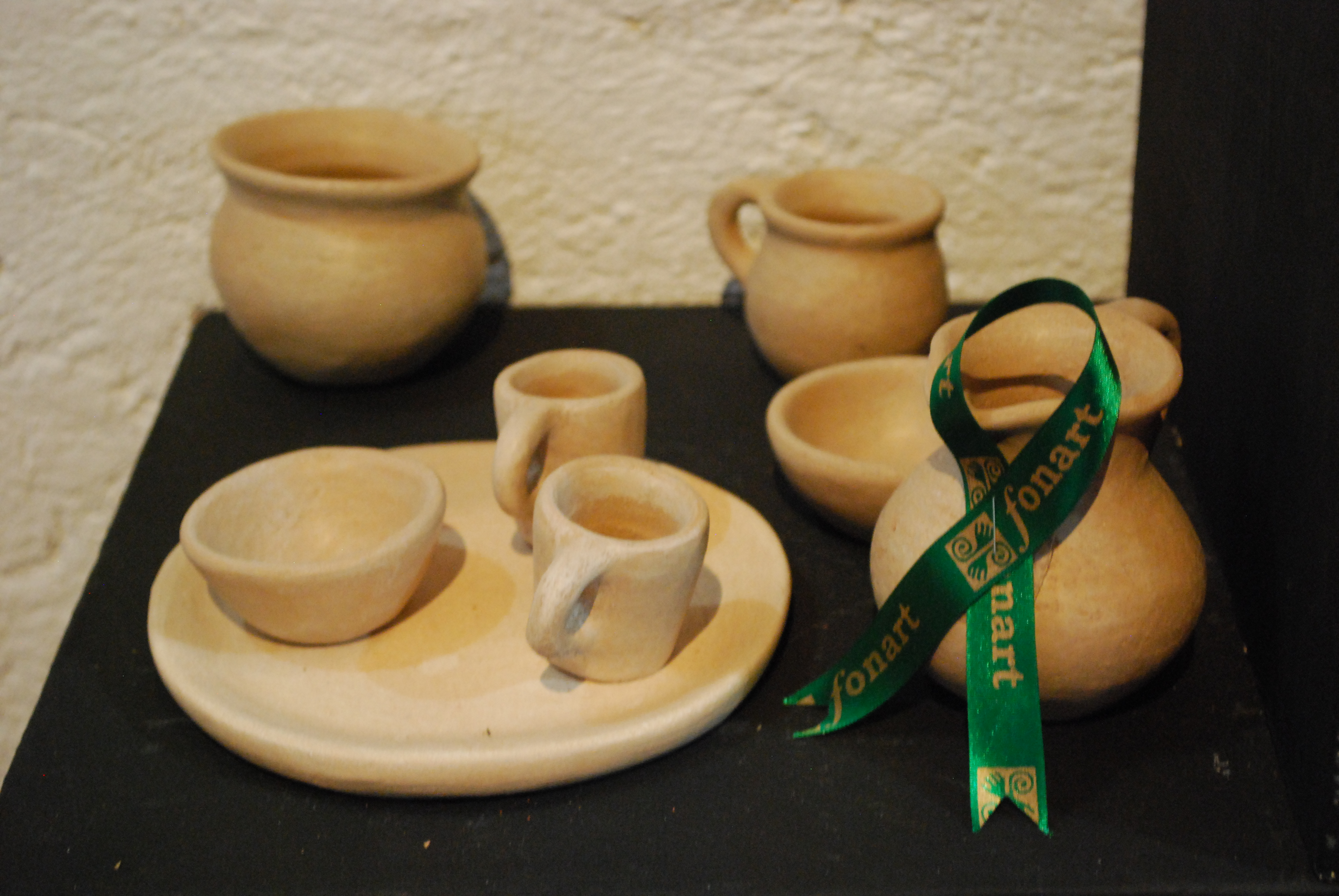
Miniature clay dishes

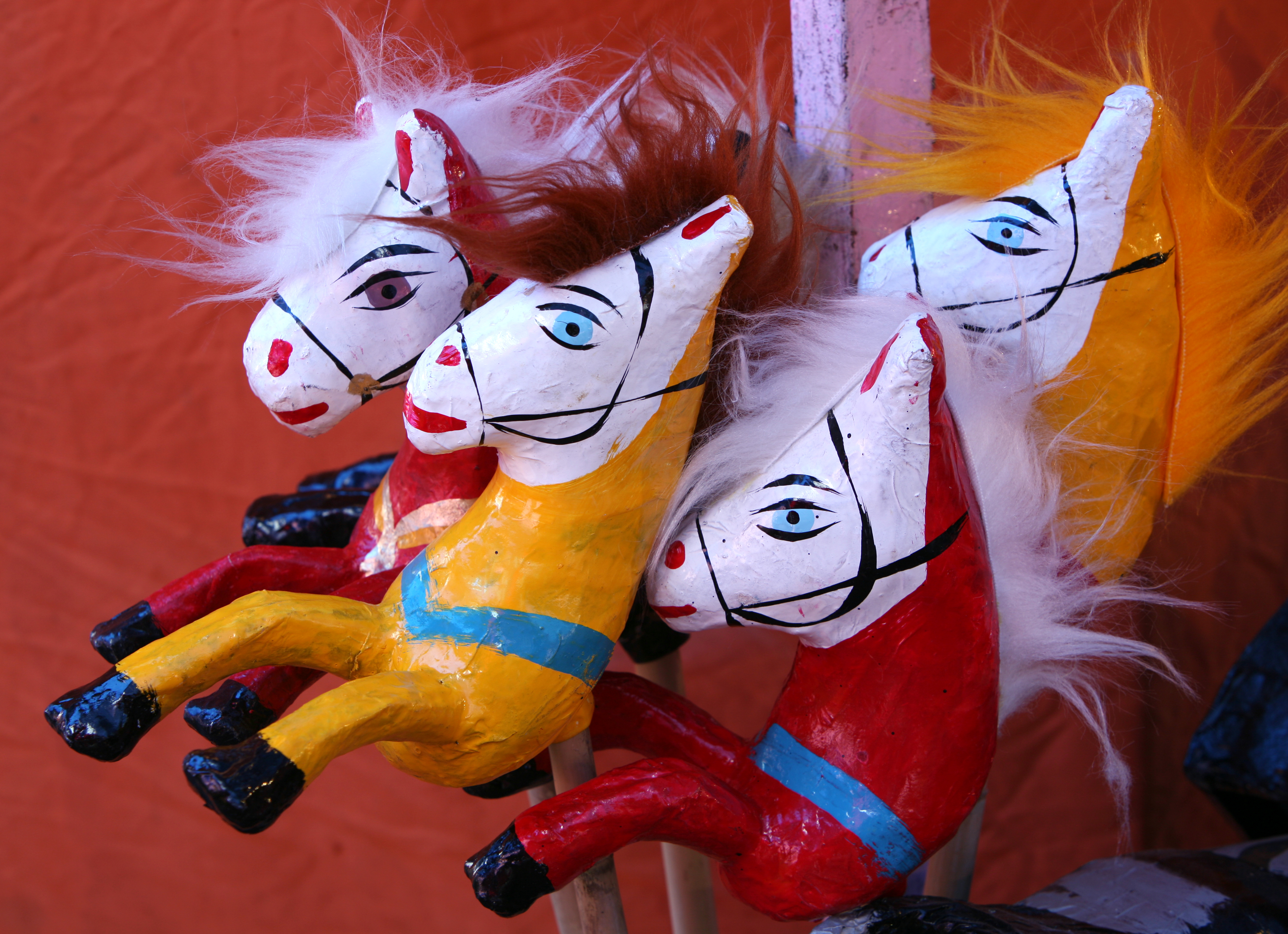
Cartonería/paper mache horses

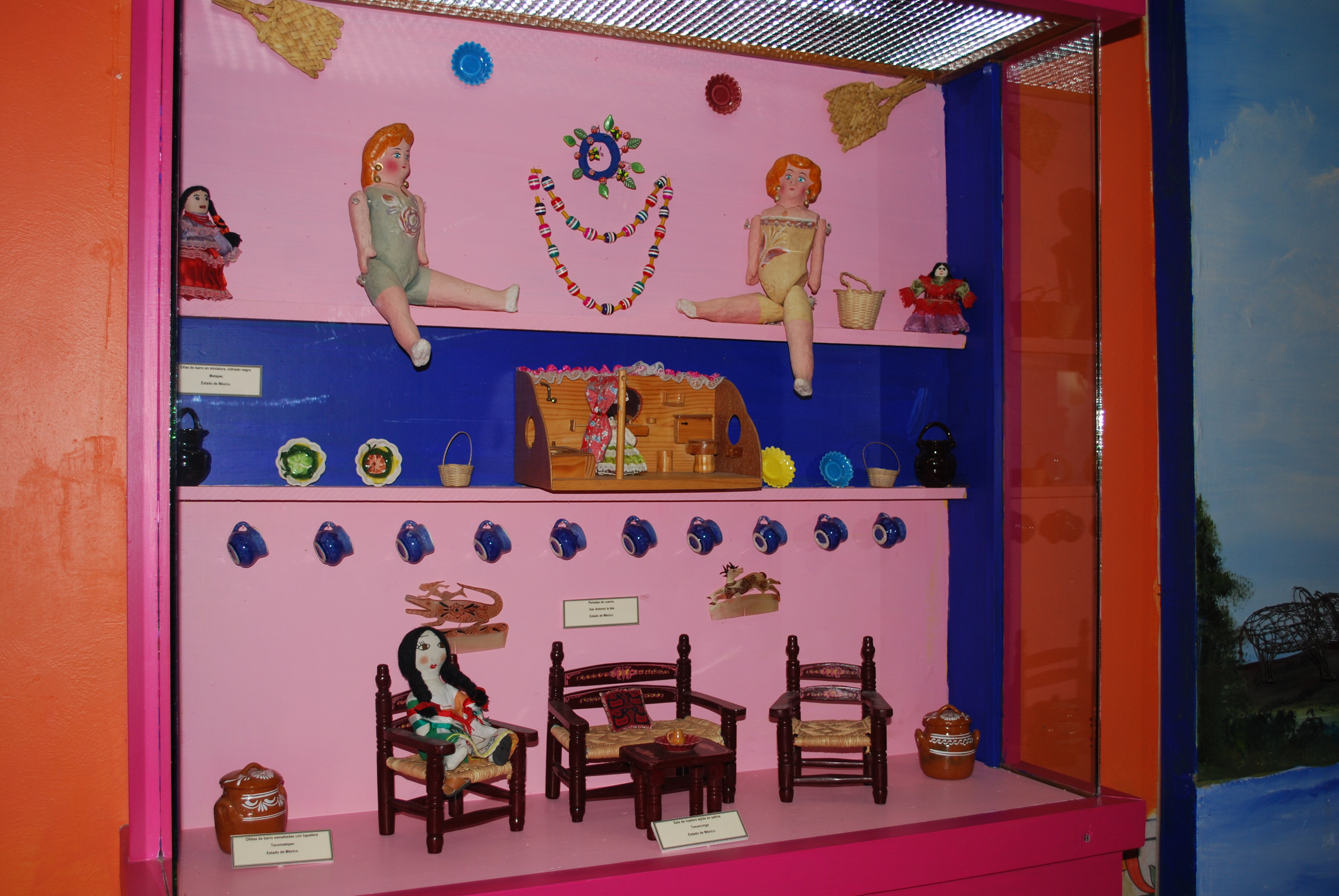
Dolls and miniatures on display at the Museo de Culturas Populares at the Centro Cultural Mexiquense in Toluca

Few countries in the world have as large a selection of traditional toys. They have been made from many different types of materials including wood, cloth, tin, papier-mâché/cartonería, porcelain, clay, palm fronds, corn husks, straw, seeds, scrap metal, glass, and more. This is particularly true of miniatures. The toys tend to have simple designs in bright colors. Mexico is unusual in that it has a wide variety of toys fired from clay, especially in Oaxaca. Toys made with a very hard papier-mâché called cartonería have a long history in Mexico. These include dolls, horse figures, piñatas, swords and masks. Most are made in Silao and Celaya. In Mexico City they are also made including items such as piggy banks and bird figures. These toys are usually made by pressing the treated paper over molds.

The most common toys include wooden tops, yo-yos, cup and ball, marionettes, kits, hobby horses, marbles, whistles, trains of wood and tin, jacks made of apricot pits, rag dolls, slingshots, mobiles, busses, dollhouses, doll kitchens and doll storefronts, sets of toys to imitate social scenes, and even elaborate miniatures such as carousels and ferris wheels. Traditional board games include oca and the still widely played lotería game. The latter is notable because the boards feature both innocent and evil images such as devils, drunks, scorpions, hearts and flowers.

One important category of toys is that of dolls. They have been made from various materials and some have become iconic. Oaxaca is famous for rag dogs dressed in local indigenous dress. In Mexico City, dolls called “Marías” are also made from cloth and dressed to imitate indigenous women. These often carry babies and are also adorned with ribbons and fringe/lace. María dolls are well known among tourists in Mexico, even if they do not know what they are called. The dolls are made of cloth and are dressed similar to the traditional dress of Mazahua women, an indigenous group found in the State of Mexico and Michoacán. They are often sold on the street by women who make them. The filling is a material called guata, which is designed for the purpose. Culturally they are important because they present a traditional Mexican image, in contrast to commercially made dolls. Lesser known are cartonería, or Lupita dolls, which are of a very hard papier-mâché. They were originally created to imitate expensive porcelain dolls from Europe. Another European style “doll” are marionettes. Traditional marionettes are made in Puebla using brightly colored cloth for the body and appendages, but the hands, feet and head made of ceramic. Generally, these depict witches, bullfighters, devils, horses and clowns as well as famous characters such as Don Juan Tenorio and Doña Inés. Marionettes were staples of puppet shows, which often were performed by roaming individuals or groups at local fairs and parties and miniature home puppet theaters became popular in the 19th century and remained so until the mid 20th century. They were also used for teaching Catholic doctrine to children. In the early 20th century, these marionettes also included more modern and international characters such as Popeye, Charlie Chaplin, Cantinflas and soldiers. Corn husks are used in a variety of ways, including in the making of crafts like toys. Many are used to make small dolls. The husks are wrapped around bunched grasses, a corncob, or bamboo. After assembly the pieces are brightly painted with aniline dyes.

When Barbie was introduced to Mexico, it quickly replaced the traditional dolls, such as the Lupita dolls made of cartonería. However, there are various artisans who still make dolls from various materials by hand, often updating designs. Blanca Molina designs about fifty different kinds of dolls each year, and herself makes about 200 that are generally sold in specialty stores. Ana Karen Allende is a doll maker in Mexico City, whose works include traditional forms but her most popular items include male and female lucha libre wrestlers as well as aluxes, chaneques, calacas, and Mayan guardian figures. Each creation is unique with no two exactly alike. The Miss Lupita project, headed by Carolina Esparragoza received government funding to hold workshops and other events with the aim of reviving the tradition of making the dolls in Mexico City, with new designs.

The most common traditional toy still made are miniatures, generally reproductions of real world people, creatures, and objects, sold as collectibles. They have toy bows and arrows, cooking utensils, other tools. They made in a wide variety of materials including clay, wood, metal. They can be sold individually or in sets, generally to depict social scenes such as weddings, bullfights, battles, baptisms, and more. One important creator of miniatures was Angel Carranza, born in Tlaquepaque in 1901, whose work is mostly done in glass. These include sets that recreate weddings, baptisms, market scenes, bullfights, charreadas as well as Nativity scenes. Mexican toys are also often rich in ethnographic information. Miniature market scenes, similar to those made by the Aguilar family in Ocotlán, Oaxaca, and ceramic bands from Michoacán and Guerrero are often models of real-life equivalents, thereby making them invaluable tools for a better understanding of Mexican culture. Specialty miniatures include musical instruments from Ixmiquilpan, miniatures in glass from Toluca and Guadalajara, miniatures woven from palm fronds in Chigmecatitlan, and those carved from peach and other pits in the form of animals.

A number of toys were associated with certain festival, with a few remaining today. Ones that are no longer commonly made for this purpose include cartonería masks for Carnival and a small mule made of palm fronds for Corpus Christi. These were sold outside of churches on that day, complete with baskets carrying miniature fruits and vegetables. Among those that can still be found (though many have been replaced by plastic versions) include rachets, whistles, and cardboard periscopes for Holy Week . Horns for Independence Day were once made of cartoneria, decorated in the national colors with a wood mouthpiece, but these are now mostly plastic. Two that remain are the Judas figure for Holy Saturday and piñatas, originally used to celebrate Las Posadas but now also used for birthdays and other special occasions. Both are filled with candy for children to grab when they are broken. However, the Judas figure (often in the form of a devil or an unpopular personality) is destroyed by fireworks attached to its body. The piñata is broken by blindfolded children who take turns hitting it with a stick.

A number of locations in Mexico are noted for their handcrafted toys. Atzompa produces toy animals such as coyotes, monkeys, deer, bulls, pigs, and more, many of which are depicted playing musical instruments such as clarinets, horns, and drums. Juchitan creates small dolls with primitive style blue-and-white decorative features. Tehuantepec continues to make pre Hispanic tangu-yu dolls. In Jalisco’s main ceramic centers, Tlaquepaque and Tonalá, a number of toys stand out for their realistic features, especially miniatures of charros on horseback, mariachis, and famous people. They are also known for making sets that depict scenes such as weddings, bullfights, and baptisms. Popular animals include armadillos, birds, cats, and piggy banks. In Michoacán, animals and other figures are made often with grotesque features, and include monsters and demons in bright colors. Yalita, Guerrero makes animal figures such as ducks, lions, goats, and dogs with both realistic and fantastic features. These are often decorated with floral and leaf designs, and even with images of other animals.

Artisans in the Metepec, State of Mexico, make miniatures in glazed black clay, mostly decorated with gold and red painted designs. Acatlán, Puebla makes ceramic miniature antique Mexican kitchen sets. In Oaxaca, traditional wood toys are roughly cut, or carved and painted. Arrosula makes a figure with a charro hat called a “gallero” (rooster handler) with moveable arms. It is usually accompanies by replicas of roosters whose tails are made of ixtle. Salitla, Guerrero make wood toys, mostly animal figures painted wine-red and magenta, which include rabbits, birds, flowers, fruit, and leaves. Ixtapan de la Sal and Tonatico in the State of Mexico make animals figures from a local wood that is white. Wooden toys are particularly popular in Michoacán. In Paracho, they make tops, cup-and-balls, yo-yos and dreidels. Most are made from wood called tzirimu, the same wood traditionally used to make canoes and fish nets in the Lake Pátzcuaro area. Tizatlán in the city of Tlaxcala makes Mikado or pick up stick games from quince tree wood.

In the state of Morelos, miniature buildings are made, especially in the Cuernavaca and Tepoztlán areas. These include houses, castles, churches, and shacks, using scrap materials such as wood leftovers, thorns, and other plant materials. Aguascalientes makes painters of fighters or boxers of metal that have movements that simulate a fight. San Miguel de Allende makes soldier and musician figures from sheet metal painted in bright colors. In Mexico City and Oaxaca, a wide variety of animal and other figures are made of sheet metal, especially roosters, horses, and butterflies, which are painted in enamels. Santa Clara del Cobre makes miniature pots, pans, and dishes from copper. Lead miniature soldiers and other figures are made in Puebla, Celaya, Guadalajara, and Mexico City. Guadalajara makes toys in glass such as dish sets, doll parts and animals figures. The glass may be colored or clear. Alfayucan, Puebla and the Mezquital Valley in Hidalgo weave figures from palm fronds, reeds, thin sticks and staw to make items such as small birds, baskets, and cradles. Clay banks in shapes of pigs, other animals and more are still made in places such as Tlaquepaque and Santa Cruz de las Huertas, Jalisco, with some of the best made by Julio Acero of the latter town. Artisans in San Cristóbal de las Casas and Berriozábal make traditional toys.

== Market ==
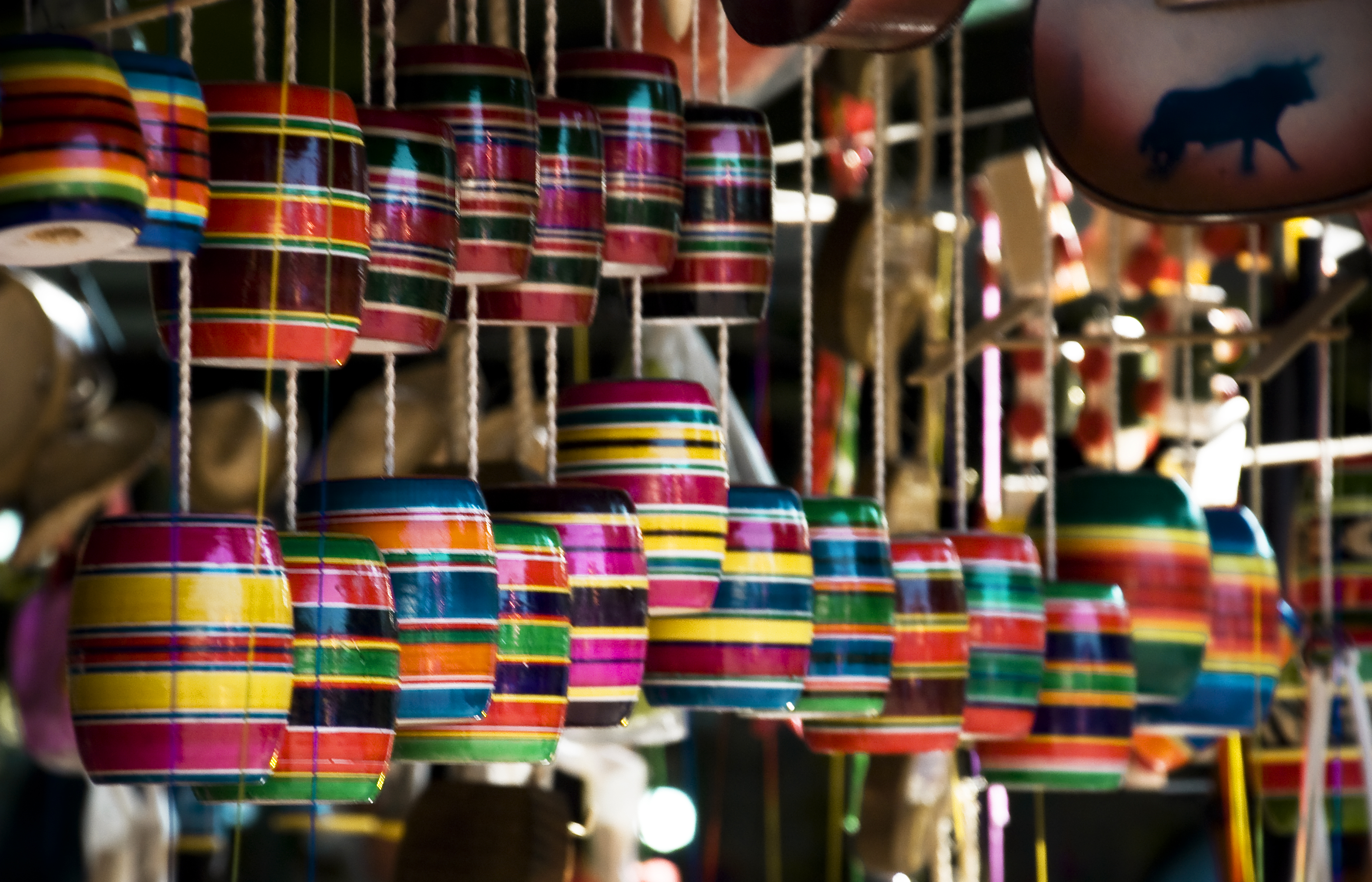
Cup and ball games hanging at a stand in a market

While Mexico has a robust market for toys, especially to give to children on Three King’s Day (instead of Christmas), this market does not generally include traditional handmade toys. Most toys sold and played with in Mexico today are commercially made from plastic and imported from places like China. Mexico is the third largest producer of toys in the world, after China and Spain, but most of these are commercially made as well. However, this manufacturing sector is diminishing. Of 300 toymaking companies registered in 1986, only eighty remained as of 2005. Those eighty companies only hold about forty percent of the domestic market. However about forty percent of the toys sold in Mexico are from the informal and unregulated market, including those who produce counterfeit toys. However, most of those toys come from China. There are two main reasons why traditional handmade toys have lost nearly all market share to commercial toys. First they are not promoted by large corporations through media such as television. Many Mexican children can be unfamiliar with them because of this. Another problem is that many of these toys are more expensive than mass-produced plastic ones.

The market for these toys is now mostly to tourists and collectors. The toys are now generally found in markets and events, especially in outlets that sell handcrafts. Traditional toy makers have looked for new market niches, for example creating more decorative pieces for export and for holidays such as Halloween. Mexican toys, especially those made of wood, have found a market in Europe even though they are being replaced in Mexico by Chinese made ones. Some have found success in modeling toys after lucha libre personalities, as international toymakers are not usually interested in those from Latin America. Similar efforts have been tried with Mexican soccer players, and entertainers such as Gloria Trevi but without success.

== Bibliography ==
- Francisco de la Torre (1994). Arte Popular Mexicano [Mexican Folk Art] (in Spanish). Mexico City: Editorial Trillas. ISBN 968-24-4874-3.
- Marion Oettinger; Nelson A. Rockefeller (2010). Folk Treasures of Mexico : The Nelson A. Rockefeller Collection. Houston: Arte Público Press. ISBN 9780810911826.
- Carlos Espejel (1977). Artesania Popular Mexicana [Mexican Folk Handcrafts] (in Spanish). Barcelone: Editorial Blune. ISBN 84-7031-043-7.
