= Centro Cultural Mexiquense =

Coordinates: 19°16′17.94″N 99°42′12.61″W

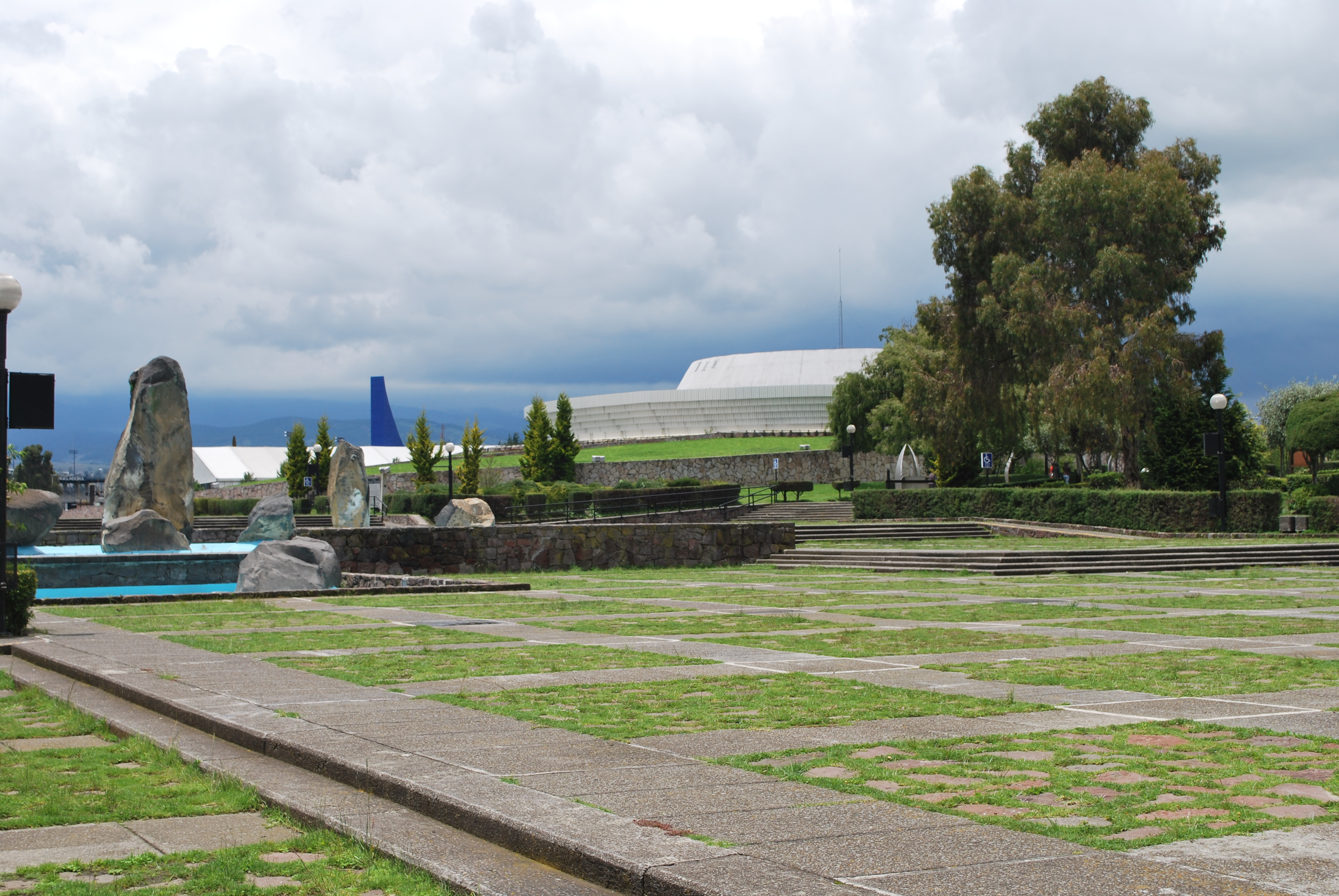
View of the mall and Museum of Modern Art at the complex

Centro Cultural Mexiquense is a cultural center located on the western edge of the city of Toluca in central Mexico. The center is run by the State of Mexico government through an agency called the Instituto Mexiquense de Cultura (IMC), the largest and most important of this agency, receiving about 80,000 visitors a year. It contains the Museum of Anthropology and History, the Modern Art Museum and the Museum of Popular Cultures as well as a Central Public Library and the Historical Archives of the State of Mexico, as well as facilities for research.

== The complex ==
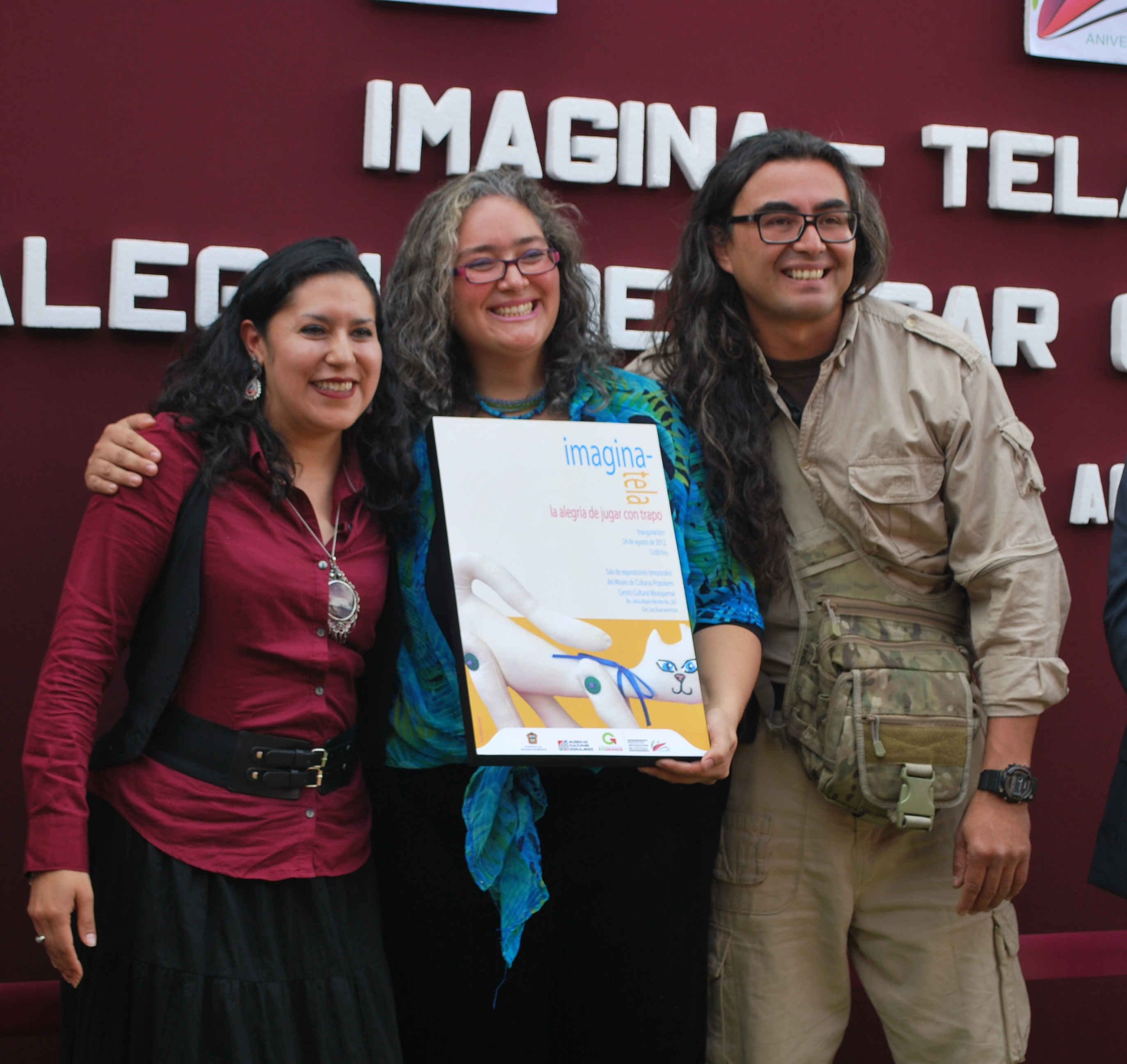
Museum director Thelma Morales with artisan Ana Karen Allende and Sinhué Lucas at opening of exhibition

The complex is located on part of the former San José de la Pila Hacienda, which was originally part of a Franciscan monastery called Nuestra Señora de la Asunción. This hacienda was one of the largest in the Valley of Toluca with large pasture for cattle and a fresh water spring which only recently has been open to the public. The hacienda came into the hands of the state in 1976. Part of the land, 177,989 hectares, was dedicated to the cultural center. The main architect of the project was Pedro Ramírez Vázquez, who designed the museums. The center was inaugurated in 1987 the three major museums and a collection of art and cultural objects donated by regional centers, museums, libraries, arts festival and individual families. Much of the grounds remain open and contain some of the original hacienda buildings along with about seventy sculptures of iron, bronze and wood.

The center hosts a number of temporary exhibits in its museums as well as cultural events on its grounds. The center sponsors an annual event called the FestinARTE, with a purpose of getting children to appreciate the arts, with workshops and performances in painting, music, ceramics, and theater for children. The Tianguis de Arte is held annually at the center. It sells art by state artists as well as books. In 2005, the center held an event inviting about 400 graffiti artists to create mural son fifty meters of screens located in the parking lot.

To serve the eastern section of the State of Mexico, a new cultural center in Texcoco called the Centro Cultural Mexiquense Bicentenario was inaugurated in 2011.

== The museums ==
=== Anthropology and History Museum ===
The three main museums are the Anthropology and History Museum, the Museum of Popular Culture and the Modern Art Museum. The Anthropology and History Museum is divided into several halls. One is dedicated to ecology, exhibiting the flora and fauna of the State of Mexico. Other halls are dedicated to the pre Hispanic period, the colonial period and Mexico since Independence. There are pre Hispanic tombs and ceramics from different cultural that inhabited the State of Mexico. There is also a sculpture of a serpent with an image of Mictlantecuhtli at its base. From the colonial period, there are sugar mills, and steel armor along with religious items and fixtures from churches. More modern items include a printing press operated by José Guadalupe Posada), illustrations and etchings from José Zubieta and José Vicente Villada from the late 19th and early 20th century, Andrés Molina Henríquez and Francisco Murguía of the Mexican Revolution and Agustín Millán and Abundio Gómez from the latter 20th century. In 2004, the museum was remodeled.

=== Museum of Popular Cultures ===
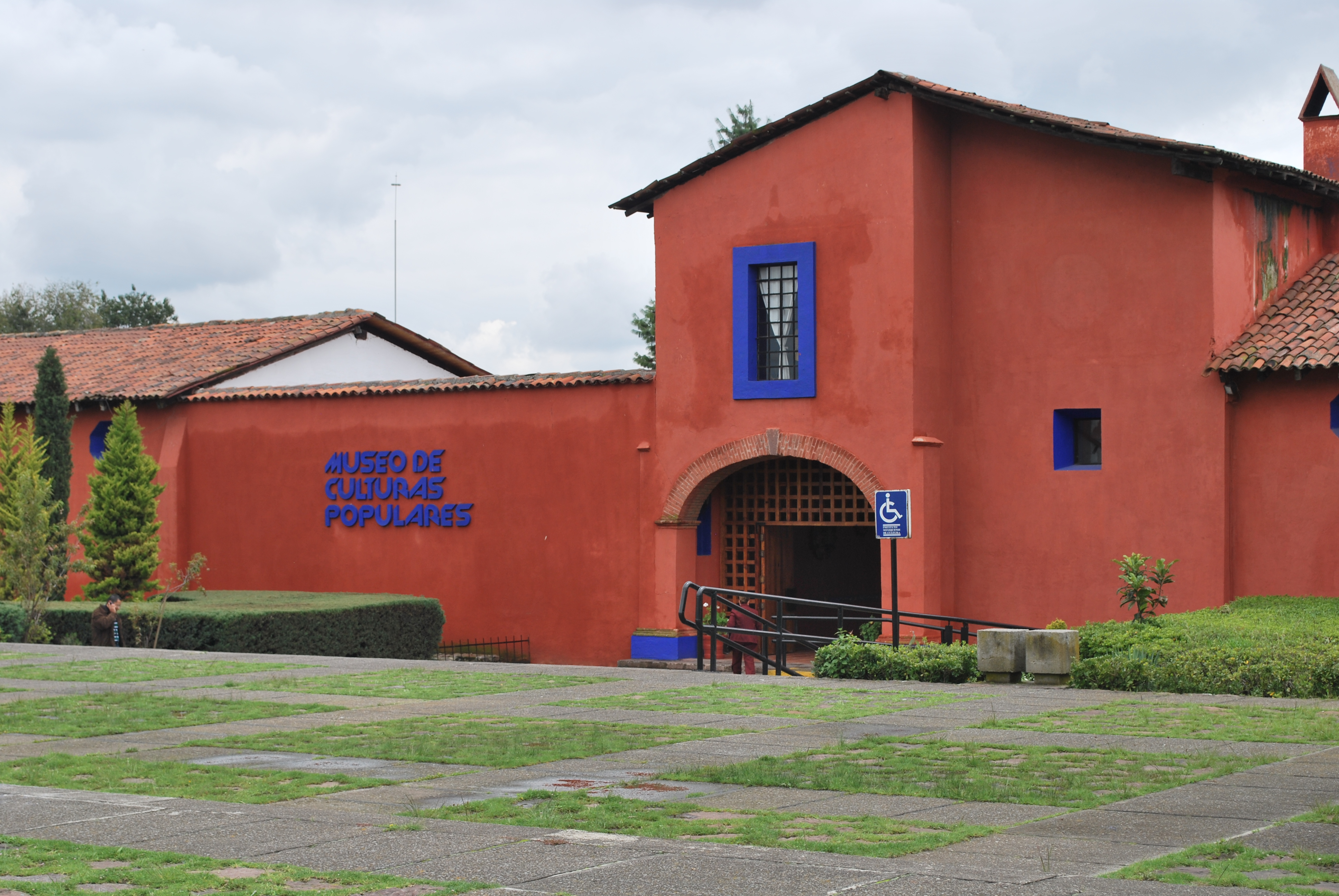
Facade of the Museum of Popular Cultures

The Museum of Popular Cultures (Museo de las Culturas Populares) is located in the former main house of the La Pila Hacienda, which originally was a monastery built at the end of the 17th century. In 1986 it was remodeled by the state government with architect Pedro Ramírez Vázquez and inaugurated as the current museum on April 27, 1987. The museum deals with the ethnography, handcrafts and folk art and the tradition of charrería in the State of Mexico.

It contains a selection of handcrafts from the State of Mexico dating from the pre Hispanic period to the present. This includes a double sided Tree of Life measuring 5.2 meters tall, the largest in Mexico with over 5,500 decorative elements. Other items in its collection include a suit from 1836, charro paraphernalia, paintings from the beginning of the 20th century, kitchen items, pottery, traditional Mexican toys, rugs made by the Otomi in Temoaya, Mazahua textiles and wood items from Ixtapan de la Sal and San Antonio la Isla. Much of the ceramic ware is from Metepec. There is also a collection of miniature items called El Tapanco, which are the winners of an annual contest in this area as well as other items donated from private sources.

The museum has five permanent exhibition halls. The Casa Artesanal room demonstrated how highland haciendas were typically decorated and includes utensils, napkins, rugs, ceramics, furniture and more. The Cocina Mexiquense is dedicated to the wares of traditional kitchens in the State of Mexico. The Juguete Popular Room is dedicated to traditional handcrafted toys such as dolls, tops, trucks generally made from materials such as paper mache, wood and metal. The toje or cuescomate, is similar to a log cabin. Its original function was to store dried corn and other foodstuffs. Today the structure is used to exhibit items from a former general store. The Charreria room contains a collection of Mexican cowboy gear, much of it antique including arms, saddles, knives and more. Among its oldest pieces are two pistols from 1850.

It has two temporary exhibition halls with exhibits from various parts of Mexico.

The museum offers guided tours, conference space, book presentations and classes in Mexican handcrafts and folk art.

=== Museum of Modern Art ===
The Modern Art Museum building was original built to be a planetarium. It has a unique circular form with a pink sandstone base and a roof covered with a series of aluminum rings said to look like a flying saucer. The museum contains seven halls in arranged in chronological order and by artistic movement. It contains works by Germán Gedovius, Leandro Izaguirre, Rufino Tamayo, Matías Goeritz, Pedro Coronel, Doctor Atl, Francisco Zúñiga, Vicente Gandía, Raúl Anguiano, Alfredo Zalce, Enrique Echeverría, Leopoldo Flores, Francisco Toledo, Francisco Moreno Capdevilla, Arnold Belkin and Gilberto Aceves Navarro. The museum also contains a multipurpose room and a bookstore.

=== Other buildings ===
Two other important buildings on the grounds are the center's library and the Archives of the State of Mexico. The library contains a collection of about 60,000 volumes, mostly in literature and history. with sections dedicated to periodicals, video and a computer room. The Archives contain about twenty million documents related to the history of the state from the colonial period to the late 20th century.
