= Ana Karen Allende =

Mexican artisan

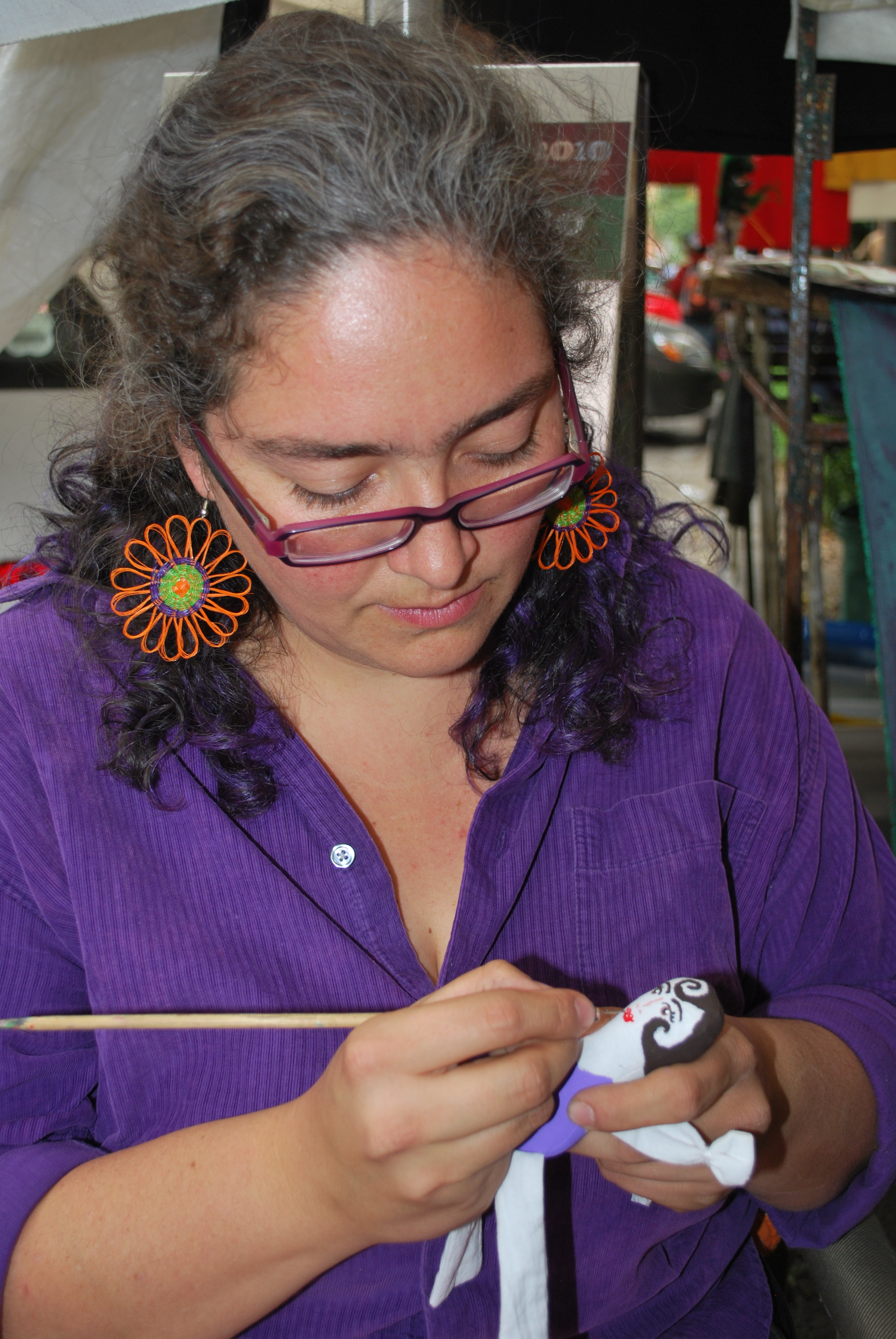
- Ana Karen Allende painting a doll
- Born: Coyoacán
- Known for: Cloth dolls and figures
- Website: http://retacitosjuguetes.blogspot.mx/

Ana Karen Allende is a Mexican artisan from the Mexico City borough of Coyoacán, who specializes in creating rag dolls and soft fabric animals. The tradition of making rag dolls in Mexico extends back to the pre-Hispanic period with the making of rag dolls reaching its peak in the 19th century. Allende's first doll was made when her sister was about to turn fifteen. For quinceañera celebrations in Xochimilco, it is customary to give the girl her “last doll” as a means of marking her transition from child to adult. Allende decided to make this doll herself, using sewing skills taught to her by her grandmother. Soon after, she began to make dolls for her friends and family, and the attention they received prompted her to think of selling them.

Allende started her own small business called Retacitos (Scraps) in 2002 involving other members of her family, such as her at that time husband Sinhúe Lucas, along with contracting various single mothers in her area to work. She sells directly to the public only on Saturdays at the Art Bazaar in the San Ángel neighborhood. Her other sales are mainly to stores and museums. She receives a number of custom orders including making dolls that look like famous people such as Frida Kahlo and even those that look like the purchaser. Allende states that her goal is to revive the craft of doll making but in a more modern form. She generally sticks to forms familiar to Mexican concepts of cultural identity such as lucha libre wrestlers, angels, traditional rag dolls, horses, mermaids, rabbits, etc. She has been recognized as an authentic Mexican craftswoman since 2010 by the government of Mexico City, her work has been exhibited in various museums and cultural events and has won the 3rd place at the VI Bienal Internacional de Arte Textil Contemporáneo WTA (2012) and the 1st place in the toys category at the Gran Premio de Arte Popular of FONART (2006) among other distinctions.

== History ==
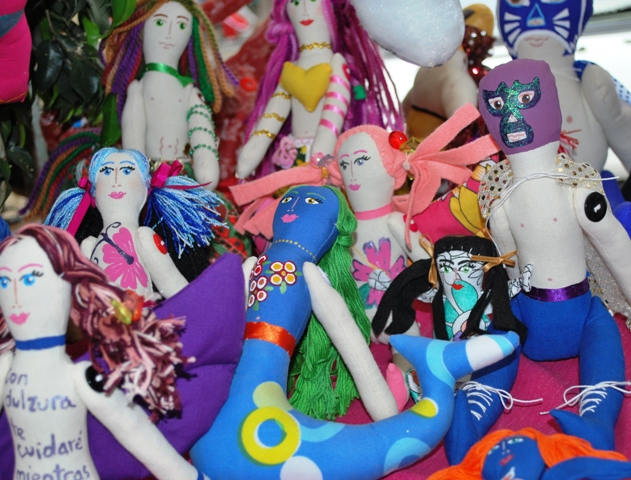
Dolls at the San Ángel stand

The tradition of making dolls in Mexico stretches back to Teotihuacan, with finds of small clay dolls with movable limbs. While toys have been made since the pre Hispanic period, most archeological samples are in poor condition because of the natural materials they were made with. The making of handcrafted dolls continues in various communities, especially indigenous ones in Chiapas, Jalisco, Michoacán, Oaxaca and Querétaro using various materials, with those made from cloth and ceramic dominating. The making of rag dolls in Mexico reached its peak in the 19th century.

Ana Karen's grandmothers taught her how to knit and embroider. Her great grandmother taught her and her sister, Lorena, how to paint and otherwise decorate their toys to personalize them. Her Mother encouraged them to create their own toys out of any material they could lay hands on. From this, she took an interest in painting and drawing, and with her parents’ support took lessons during her teens. Her grandparents lived in the center of Coyoacan, which allowed her to meet many of the artisans which sell there, learning how to work with wire. Ana Karen Allende was taught to sew by her grandmother, using a Singer sewing machine from the end of the 19th century. It was with this machine that she created her first two dolls.

When she moved to Xochimilco, she became involved in the local culture through participation in weddings, religious festivals, quinceañeras and other events. Her younger sister was about to turn fifteen and in Xochimilco it is customary for a girl at her quinceañera celebration to receive her last doll from her godparents, a sign of passing from childhood to adulthood. These dolls have hallmarks of the rite of passage such as shoes with heels instead of flats. Allende decided to make this doll for her sister herself.

This was the beginning of her research on the tradition of making rag dolls in Mexico. She soon began to make dolls as gifts for family and friends. The attention that the dolls received led to the idea of selling them. One of her first items made for sale were stuffed rabbits. She began to make and sell rag dolls and stuffed animals beginning in 2002 with the target market of making the “last dolls” of quinceañeras. Her then mother-in-law worked in cartonería and introduced her to many craftsmen in the city expanding her customer base. Since then, she has developed her craft to revive the tradition of making Mexican style handcrafted dolls and stuffed animals but with modern innovations.

== Creations ==
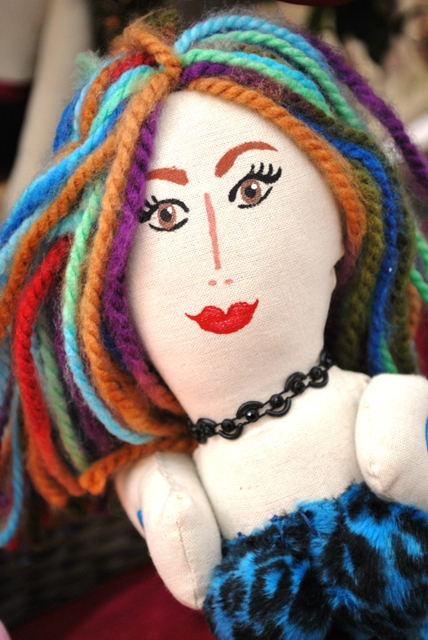
Face of one of the dolls

She says that commercial rag dolls and stuffed animals are impersonal and merely copies. Her creations are unique with no two exactly alike. The most popular figures include those from lucha libre such as Blue Demon, Santo, and El Rayo de Jalisco, as well as those Mexico's past such as aluxes, chaneques, calacas and Mayan guardian figures. Her works include images of painter Frida Kahlo and creatures reminiscent of alebrijes, as well as traditional rag dolls, fairies, horses, centaurs, mermaids and much more. However, she says that except for custom orders, all the pieces made are based on Mexican culture and tradition in some way. So images are not that of popular culture from outside of Mexico but of figures which have been known to the Mexican handcrafts and folk art tradition.

She has also made dolls that look like famous people and of her own clients. One of her creations for Retacitos was a doll made to look like singer Cecilia Toussaint, which was used to open one of the singer's shows. She did a life-sized one of writer Julio Cortázar complete with his cat and a cigarette. When she receives an order of this type, she does research on the person to know more about them.

== Retacitos ==
Since 2003, Allende has sold her wares each Saturday at the San Ángel art and handcrafts bazaar located at the San Jacinto Plaza. Her work is marketed under the name of Retacitos (scraps), a small family enterprise trademarked since 2005. They also work with contractors for many of the pieces, who are generally single mothers, who can then work at home and take care of their children. The name originated in the fact that most households have small bits of cloth, string and other items which can be used to make dolls and other creative items. Much of this is wasted as many people no longer know how to sew. The business has focused on getting their merchandise in wider circulation in Mexico City, Cancún and Nayarit. She has also worked with the Universidad Autónoma Metropolitana and ITESM CCM to develop the business. Retacitos sells directly to the public only in San Angel on Saturdays. Other sales are through stores such as those in Cacha Estudio, Garros Galería the Museo de Arte Popular and the Museo Mexicano del Diseño, Museo del Juguete the Museo de Estanquillo and others.

== Exhibitions and prizes ==
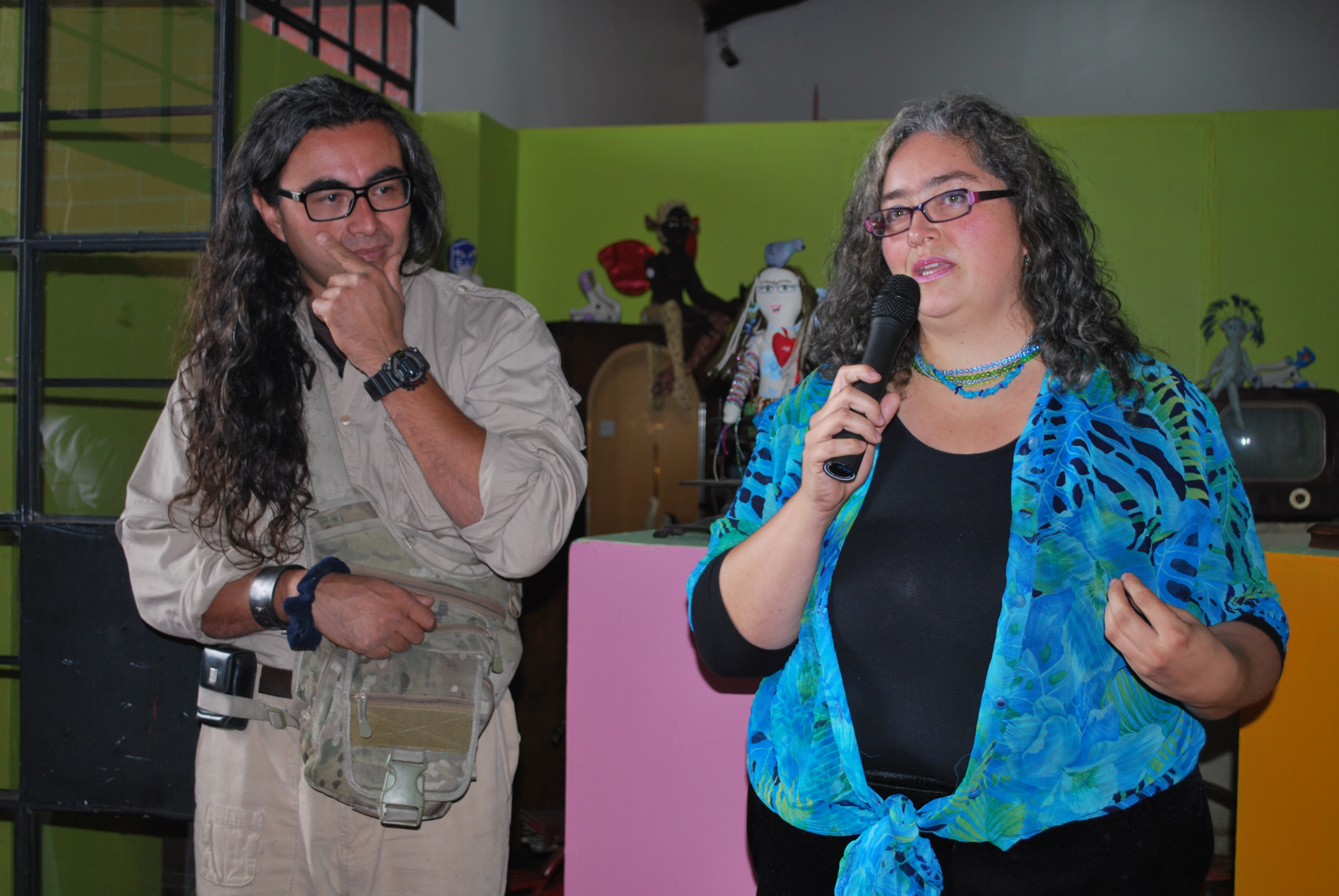
Allende and husband Sinhué Lucas at opening of exhibit at the Centro Cultural Mexiquense.

Allende and her team have exhibited Retacitos project work in various states of Mexico and in some countries of the world, in museums, art galleries, fairs, cultural centers, stores with cultural interests. They have also been interviewed in various media, both print and television and internet. With the support of a government agency called FONDESO, the enterprise has participated in exhibitions at the World Trade Center and in various Ferias de Economía Popular (Popular Economy Fairs). Her work has been exhibited in countries such as Germany, Canada, France, Switzerland, Spain, Uruguay and Guatemala. Allende's work has been shown in the Museo Dolores Olmedo and the Museo de Arte Popular, and at festivals such as the Festival de las Almas in Valle de Bravo. For this festival a set of dolls related to Mexico's Day of the Dead were created. The exhibit was called “Desde el más allá con alma de trapo” (From the beyond with a soul of rags), which consisted of about fifty pieces including mobiles, toys and other pieces at the Museo Joaquín Arcadio Pagaza. They related to death and Mexican popular culture. She had an individual exhibition in honor of International Women's Day at the Carranza Cultural Center called "Retazos con Mirada de Mujer" (Scraps with the Gaze of a Woman) in March 2012. A cloth work of hers called "Yaxché, el árbol sagrado maya (Yaxché, the Mayan sacred tree) is part of the collection of French association Fiber Art Fever, which was also included in an exhibition called "Mágico Textil" (Textile Magic) at the Casa Abierta al Tiempo, at the Universidad Autónoma Metropolitana in Mexico City in May 2011.

She won first prize in the toy category at the Gran Premio de Arte Popular FONART in 2006 and is certified by the Consejo de Pueblos y Barrios Originarios del DF city as an authentic Mexican artisan. In 2007, her work was exhibited in the Museo del Estanquillo, which included a meter tall Judas figure and a life sized doll of Frida Kahlo. Today, these pieces belong to writer Iván Restrepo. Her work, “Luchare Por Tus Sueños” (Will Fight For Your Dreams) with a lucha libre theme, earned third place out of sixty entrance at the VI Bienal Internacional de Arte Textil.

== See also ==
CNN report on Karen's work
