= Echo, Huesca =

Echo
- Locality
- Hecho
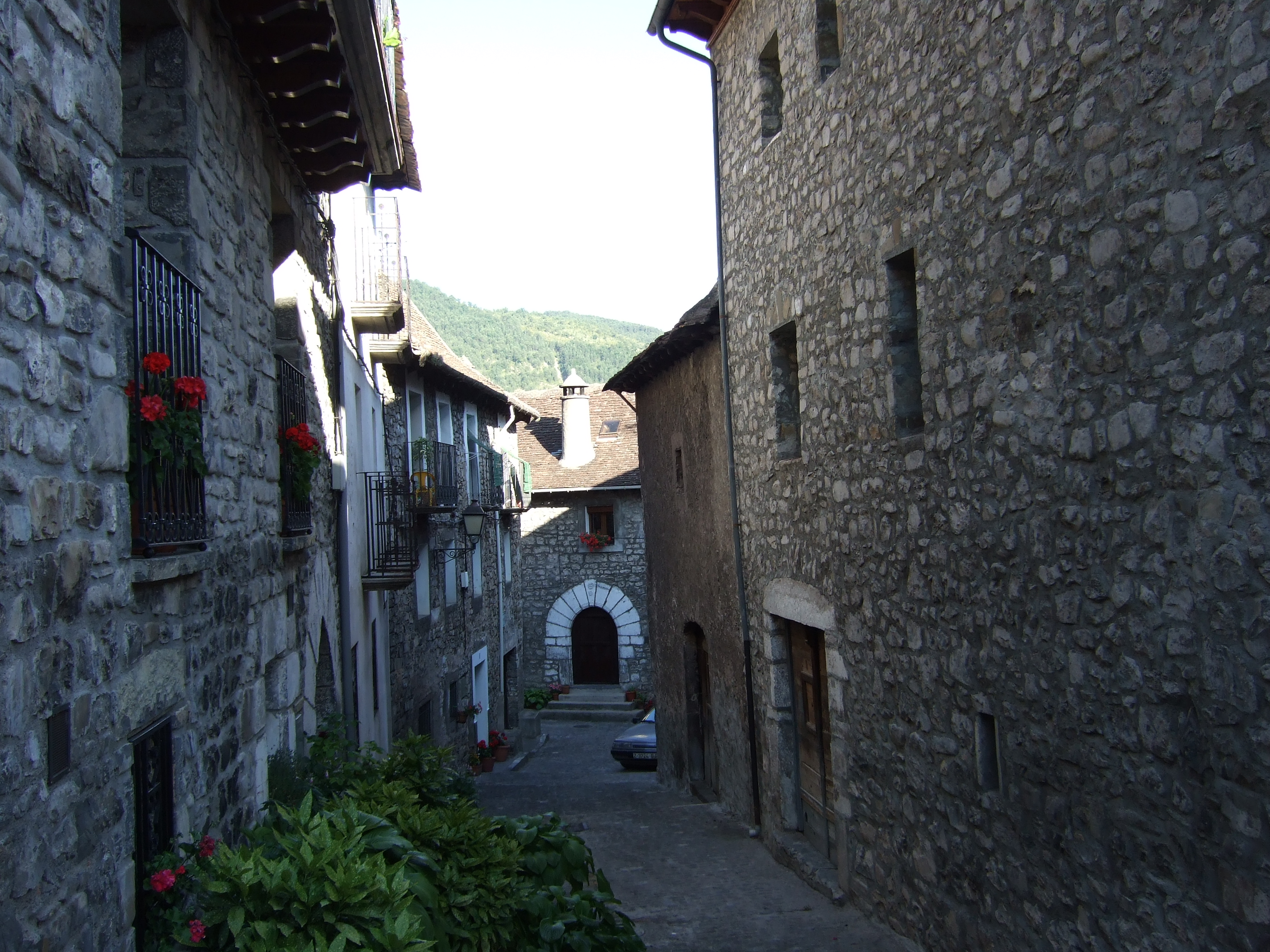

- Location within Aragon Location within Spain
- Coordinates: 42°44′19″N 0°44′57″W
- Country: Spain
- Autonomous community: Aragon
- Province: Province of Huesca
- Municipality: Valle de Hecho
- Elevation: 816 m (2,677 ft)

Population
  - Total: 549

Echo or Hecho is a locality located in the municipality of Valle de Hecho, in Huesca province, Aragon, Spain. As of 2020, it has a population of 549. Echo is the capital of the municipality of Valle de Hecho.

== Geography ==
Echo is located 111 km north-northwest of Huesca.
