= Siresa, Aragon =

Siresa
- Locality
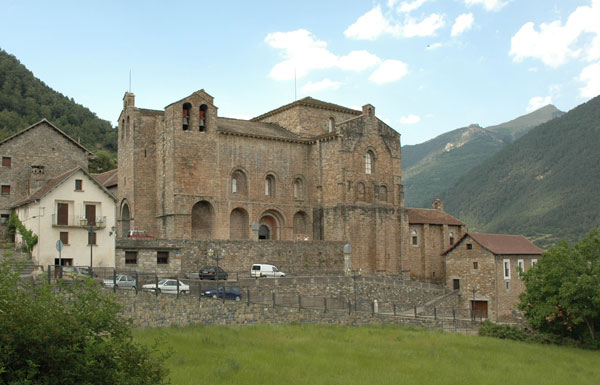

- Location within Aragon Location within Spain
- Coordinates: 42°45′24″N 0°45′14″W
- Country: Spain
- Autonomous community: Aragon
- Province: Province of Huesca
- Municipality: Valle de Hecho
- Elevation: 887 m (2,910 ft)

Population
  - Total: 111

Siresa is a locality located in the municipality of Valle de Hecho, in Huesca province, Aragon, Spain. Population was 111 in 2020.

== Geography ==
Siresa is located 113km north-northwest of Huesca.
