= Tata Duende =

Supernatural creature

The Tata Duende or El Dueño del Monte is a supernatural creature appearing in cultural folklore stories, mostly evident in Creole cultures. Tata Duende is considered a powerful spirit that protects animals and the jungle, though it is believed to lack thumbs. There are many stories that have been passed on from generation to generation, to warn against this spirit. This creature has appeared on a postage stamp of Belize as part of a series on Belizean folklore. The name Tata Duende comes from the Yucatec Maya word "Tata" meaning Grandfather or old and the word "Duende" is Spanish for goblin. The Spanish term duende originated as a contraction of the phrase dueño de casa or duen de casa, "possessor of a house", and was originally conceptualized as a mischievous spirit inhabiting a house. It is said that if you encounter him in the forest, you must show your hands with the thumbs hidden or he will break them off. Yet, he is regarded as a caring spirit.

== Origin ==
The Tata Duende is a famous folklore common to the Maya culture and the Mestizo culture. According to different stories, the Tata Duende is well known for luring children into the jungle, therefore, the Tata Duende has been used to scare children into behaving. Farmers would blame the Tata Duende if weird things happened on the farm. For example: it was common to see a horse's mane braided and it is claimed that these braids would be difficult to loosen and sometimes had to be cut. The true origin of the 'Tata Duende' seems to be quite unclear since many countries may have similar descriptions but different names. However, the term 'Tata Duende' seems to be coined in the Belizean folklore. Between the Yucatec Maya of Belize the Tata duende is known as Nukuch Tat or Tata Balam, it is seen as a good Maya guardian spirit of the forest, animals and humans. The Yucatec Maya of Belize continue giving offerings to the Tata duende for protection and for their help.

== Description ==
People who claimed to have seen the 'Tata Duende' said he was about 3 feet tall and wore a wide brimmed hat. Sometimes he wore a red hat and animal skin for clothing. He is also described as having his feet pointing backwards and his thumbs missing. Parents would tell their children that if they ever came across this creature to hide their thumbs or the Duende would bite it off. Some stories of people who have encountered the 'Tata Duende' say that they could recognize him because of his distinct whistle. Others say that he smokes cigars and plays the guitar. The creature was investigated on a 5th-season episode of Destination Truth, where it was speculated that Tata Duende sightings might actually be of the indigenous spider monkey. He can also be seen on the TV show Boogeyman episode 13.

== Stories ==
There are many stories warning people to be cautious at farms or jungles when walking alone. The Duende has a special interest in children where he would lure them deeper into the woods and the only way to escape him would be if you hide your thumbs and show only your four fingers. The Duende would think you are like him and would let you go. Other stories say that the Duende would appear mostly during the 'Lenten Season' especially on 'Good Friday.' He is also known for braiding horses' manes and little girls' hair. In addition, the 'Tata Duende' is known to often change into a small animal, or even someone you know. Between the Yucatec Maya, the Tata Duende(Nukuch Tat) protects children in the bush. Many Yucatec Maya asks permission from the Nukuch Tat before entering the Bush or before entering to hunt.

== See also ==
- Curupira
- Duende
- Dwarf (folklore)
- Gnome
- Little people (mythology)
