= Embún =

- Locality
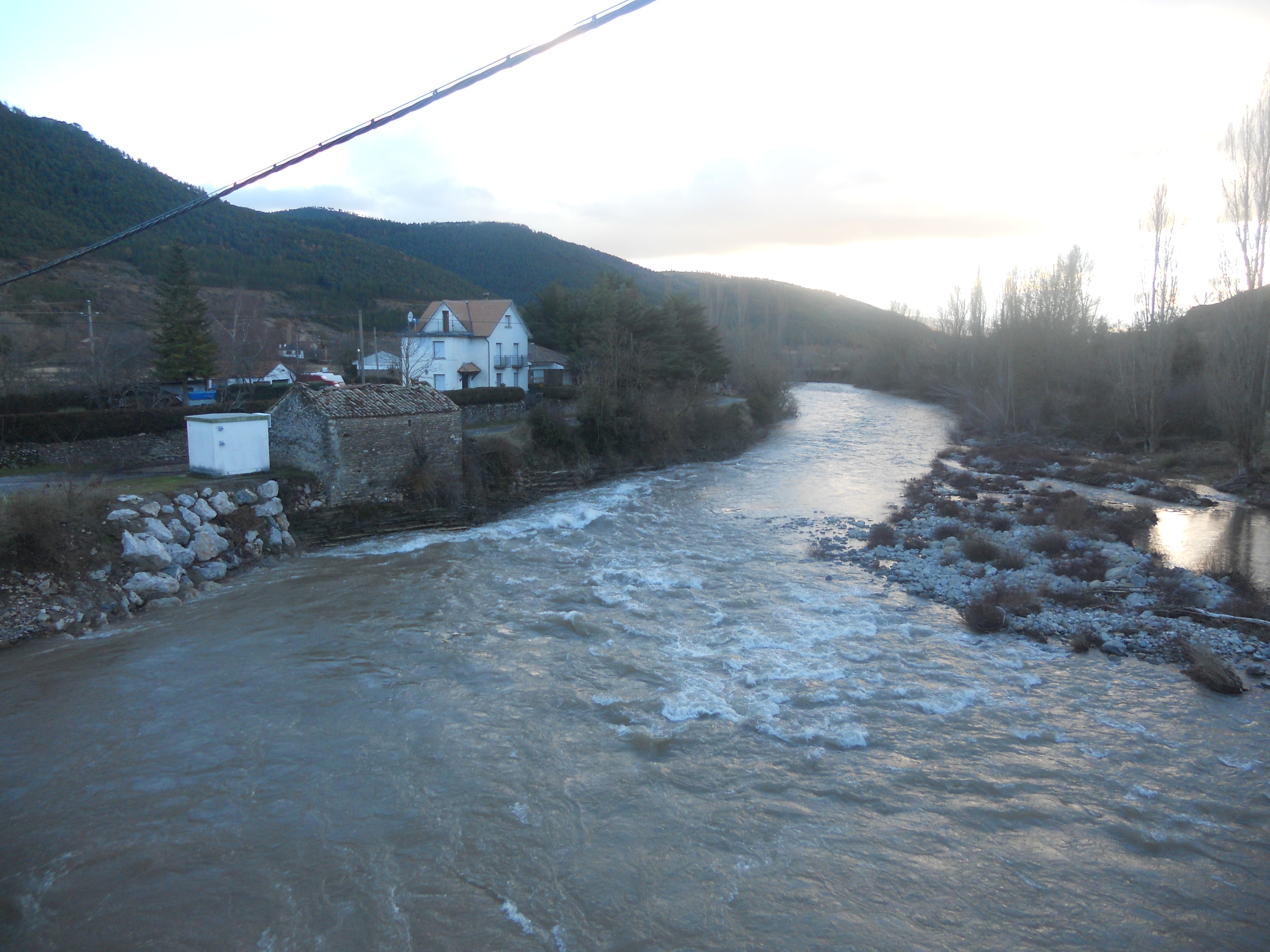

- Location within Aragon Location within Spain
- Coordinates: 42°37′37″N 0°43′30″W
- Country: Spain
- Autonomous community: Aragon
- Province: Province of Huesca
- Municipality: Valle de Hecho
- Elevation: 751 m (2,464 ft)

Population
  - Total: 104

Embún is a locality located in the municipality of Valle de Hecho, in Huesca province, Aragon, Spain. As of 2020, it has a population of 104.

== Geography ==
Embún is located 99km north-northwest of Huesca.
