= Urdués =

- Locality
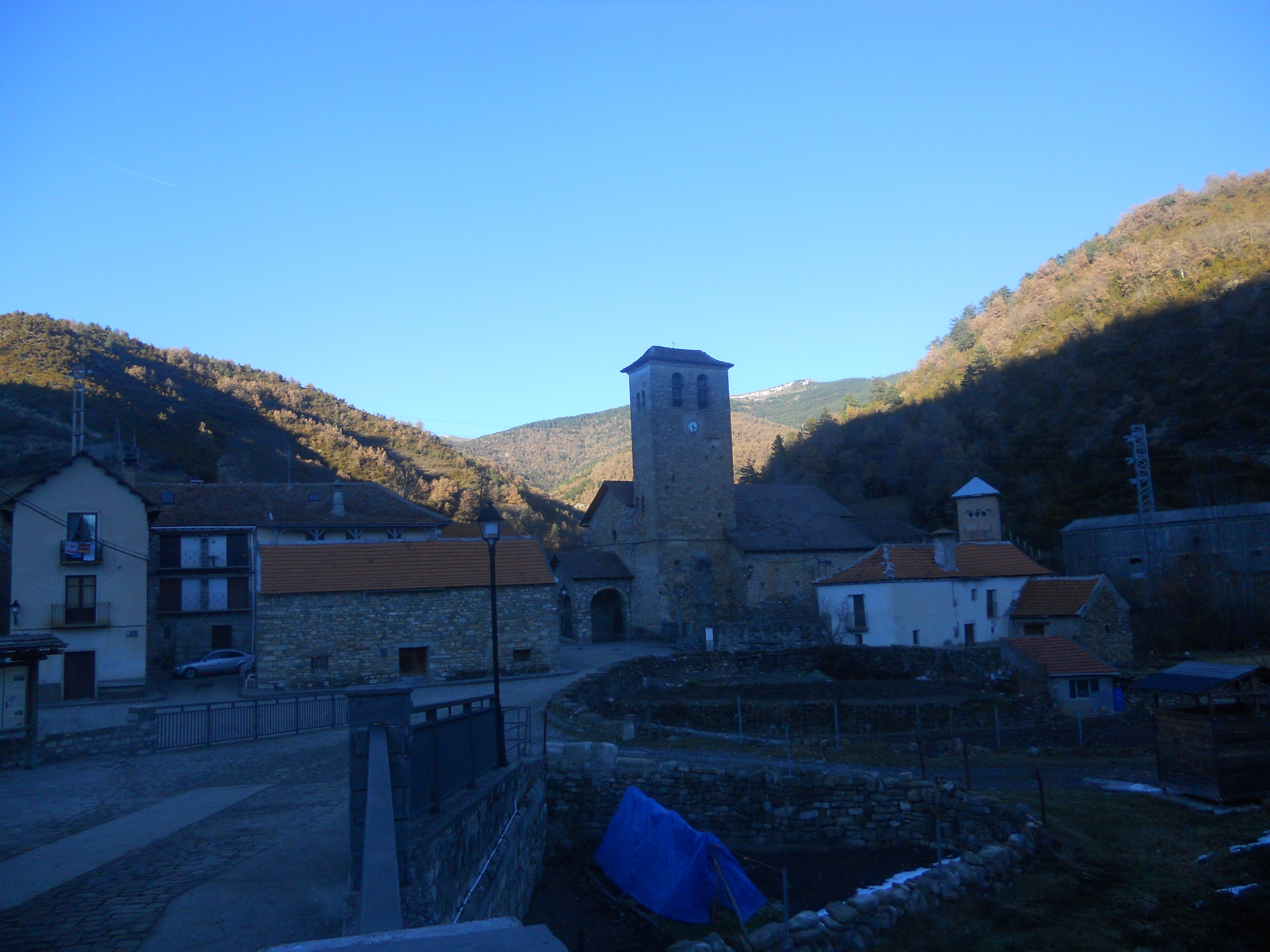

- Location within Aragon Location within Spain
- Coordinates: 42°42′43″N 0°42′55″W
- Country: Spain
- Autonomous community: Aragon
- Province: Province of Huesca
- Municipality: Valle de Hecho
- Elevation: 892 m (2,927 ft)

Population
  - Total: 48

Urdués is a locality located in the municipality of Valle de Hecho, in Huesca province, Aragon, Spain. As of 2020, it has a population of 48.

== Geography ==
Urdués is located 110km north-northwest of Huesca.
