= Santa Lucía, Aragon =

Santa Lucía
- Locality
- Santa Lucia
- Location within Aragon Location within Spain
- Coordinates: 42°42′22″N 0°47′20″W
- Country: Spain
- Autonomous community: Aragon
- Province: Province of Huesca
- Municipality: Valle de Hecho
- Elevation: 762 m (2,500 ft)

Population
  - Total: 5

Santa Lucía or Santa Lucia is a locality located in the municipality of Valle de Hecho, in Huesca province, Aragon, Spain. As of 2020, it has a population of 5.

== Geography ==
Santa Lucía is located 98km north-northwest of Huesca.
