= Agustín Milián =

Spanish handball player (born 1958)

Personal information
- Full name: Agustín Milián Gracía
- Born: 28 August 1958 (age 66); Barcelona, Spain
- Height: 179 cm (5 ft 10 in)
- Weight: 77 kg (170 lb)

Sport
- Country: Spain
- Sport: Handball

Achievements and titles
- Olympic finals: 1980, 1984

Agustín Milián Gracía, (Note: In this Spanish name, the first or paternal surname is Milián and the second or maternal family name is Gracía.) (born 28 August 1958), also known as Agustín Milián García or Agustín Millán García is a former Spanish handball player who competed in the 1980 Summer Olympics and in the 1984 Summer Olympics.

In 1980 he was part of the Spanish team which finished fifth in the Olympic tournament. He played five matches and scored twelve goals.

Four years later he finished eighth with the Spanish team in the 1984 Olympic tournament. He played three matches and scored three goals.
