= Valle de Hecho =

Coordinates: 42.717°N 0.733°W

Valle de Hecho (Spanish) Val d'Echo (Aragonese)
- Coat of arms

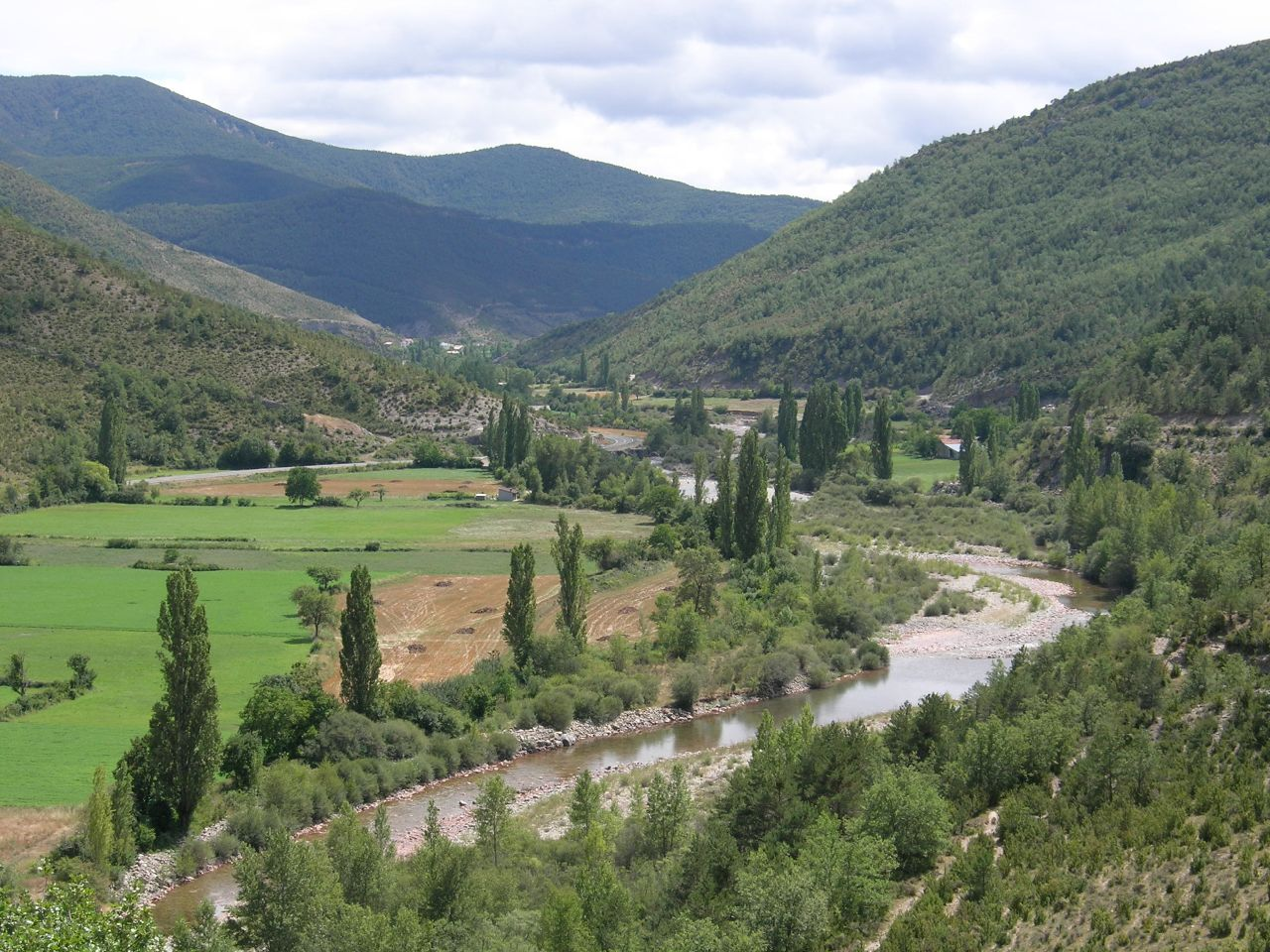
- Country: Spain
- Autonomous community: Aragon
- Province: Huesca
- Municipality: Valle de Hecho

Area
  - Total: 234 km^{2} (90 sq mi)

Population (2025-01-01)
  - Total: 813
  - Density: 3.47/km^{2} (9.00/sq mi)
- Time zone: UTC+1 (CET)
  - Summer (DST): UTC+2 (CEST)

Valle de Hecho (Val d'Echo in Aragonese language) is a municipality located in the province of Huesca, Aragon, Spain. According to the 2004 census (INE), the municipality has a population of 984 inhabitants.

== Villages ==
- Siresa
- Embún
- Urdués
- Santa Lucía
- Siresa.

== See also ==
- Jacetania
- Abbey of San Pedro de Siresa
- Rosario Ustáriz Borra
