= Alux =

Creature of Maya mythology

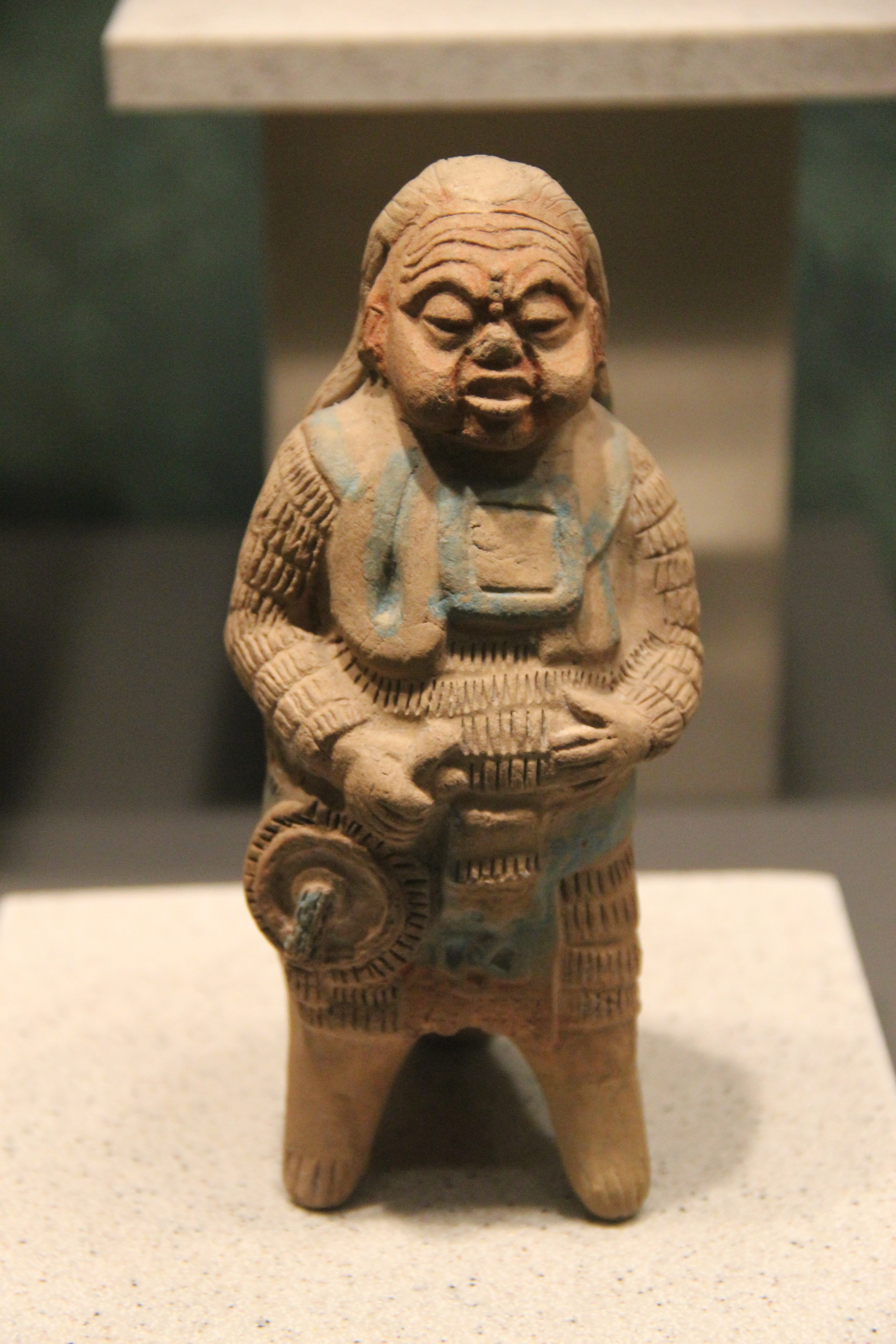

An alux (Mayan: [aˈluʃ], plural: aluxo'ob [aluʃoˀːb]) is a type of sprite or spirit in the mythological tradition of certain Maya peoples from the Yucatán Peninsula, Belize and Guatemala, also called Chanekeh or Chaneque by the Nahuatl people. Aluxo'ob are conceived of as being small, only about knee-high, and in appearance resembling miniature traditionally dressed Maya people. Tradition holds that aluxob are generally invisible but are able to assume physical form for purposes of communicating with and frightening humans as well as to congregate. They are generally associated with natural features such as forests, caves, stones, and fields but can also be enticed to move somewhere through offerings. These associations are because aluxo’ob were created with mud, leaves, and divine breath by the ancient Mayan gods. Their description and mythological role are somewhat reminiscent of other sprite-like mythical entities in a number of other cultural traditions (such as the leprechaun or Brownie ), as the tricks they play are similar.

Some Maya believe that the Aluxo'ob are called into being when a farmer builds a little house on his property, most often in a maize field (milpa). For seven years, the alux will help the corn grow, summon rain and patrol the fields at night, whistling to scare off predators or crop thieves. At the end of seven years, the farmer must close the windows and doors of the little house, sealing the alux inside. If this is not done, the alux will run wild and start playing tricks on people.

Some contemporary Maya even consider the single- and double-story shrines that dot the countryside to be kahtal alux, the "houses of the alux" (although their true origins and purpose are unknown).

Stories say that they will occasionally stop and ask farmers or travellers for an offering. If they refuse, the aluxo'ob will often wreak havoc and spread illness. However, if their conditions are met, it is thought the alux will protect a person from thieves or even bring them good luck. If they are treated with respect, they can be very helpful. Because they are known for playing mischievous pranks such as putting out fires to throwing pots and pans into the yard, many construction companies in the Yucatán Peninsula perform ceremonies at worksites to avoid offending them and to prevent such incidents from occurring.

It is believed that it is not good to name them aloud, as it will summon a disgruntled alux from its home.

The word "duende" is sometimes used interchangeably with "alux". Duende is a Spanish word for a supernatural creature (commonly a goblin) or force. In fact, because of such striking similarities, some suspect that the Maya's belief of aluxob developed through interactions with the Spanish or pirates during the 16th century. Pirates of that era were often from the British Isles, where belief in faeries was quite common, especially amongst those of lower socio-economic class (as pirates generally would have been). However, the Maya themselves would claim that the alux are the spirits of their ancestors, or the spirits of the land itself, preceding contact with Western civilization.

The supposition that aluxob featured in the mythical traditions of the pre-Columbian Maya is possibly supported by similar conceptions postulated from depictions in pre-Columbian artworks, but there is no direct evidence.

In 2023, the sitting president of Mexico, Andrés Manuel López Obrador, posted a picture of an alleged alux on Twitter, claiming that it had been spotted by an engineer working on a rail project.

== See also ==
- Maya mythology
- Wayob
