= Chaneque =

Creature in Mexican folklore

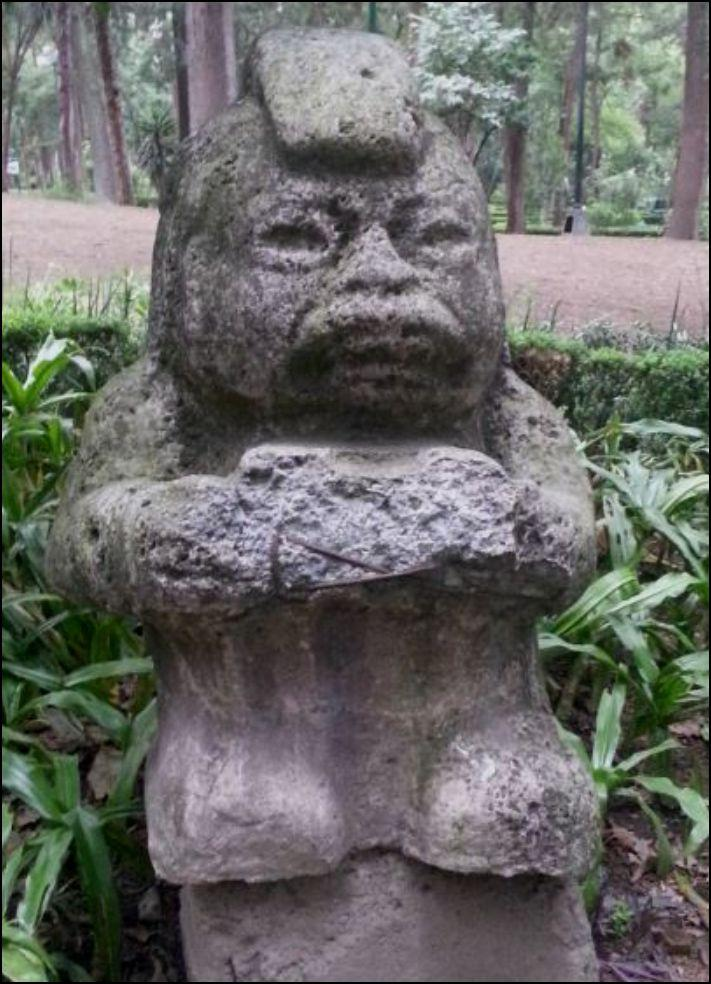
Chaneque

Chaneque, Chanekeh, or Ohuican Chaneque, as they were called by the Aztecs, are legendary creatures in Mexican folklore, meaning "those who inhabit dangerous places" or "owners of the house" in Náhuatl. These small, sprite-like beings hold a connection to elemental forces and are regarded as guardians of nature. Comparable mythical beings are found across Mesoamerican and Latin American folklore, often referred to as "duende" in Spanish. Within Yucatec Mayan folklore, the Yucatán Peninsula's tradition identifies similar elemental entities as "aluxob".

In some contemporary legends, chaneques are portrayed as children with the faces of elderly men or women, capable of leading people astray for several days. During this period, victims experience memory lapses, attributed to their alleged transport to the Underworld, specifically Mictlán or Chiconauhmictlán. The entrance to this realm is believed to be located within a dried kapok tree. In other instances, chaneques are said to intimidate intruders to the point where their souls leave their bodies. A specific ritual is required to reunite the soul with the body; otherwise, illness and subsequent death result.

Chaneques have been portrayed both positively and negatively in Mexican media across centuries. Mexican writer Artemio de Valle-Arizpe, after delving into Mexican colonial history during his time as a diplomat in Spain and at the General Archive of the Indies, penned a number of books on colonial legends, often depicting chaneques with negative undertones as entities associated with the Christian devil. In Valle-Arizpe's tale "Un duende y un perro" which is set in the late 16th century, the chaneque pestering Dona Luisa is described as a "demon", inflicting bruises and inducing fear.

This complex narrative has evolved over time, blending elements of protection, mischief, and supernatural forces into the fabric of Mexican cultural heritage.

== Background ==
Chaneques have a long history in Mexico, although they are represented differently based on the state. They have been found in Mesoamerican legends, as well as in documents written by the Spanish Inquisition. Scholars debate the idea that chaneques and duendes are the same mythological beings. These creatures have different names throughout the world, but they share many characteristics. The name "duende" comes from the Indo-European word dema, which means connected to the home. The root word dem- means house or household. This name stems from the fact that they tend to bother individuals in their homes.

Villagers used to give the chaneques offerings in exchange for protection. They hoped that the chaneques would protect their harvest and prevent intruders, or other evil beings, from entering their homes. Another form of protection is wearing clothing inside out if traveling in the forest.

Chaneques also had a reputation for kidnapping young men and women to have sexual relations. Historian Javier Ayala Calderon discovered an archive from 1676 in which a young man narrated his sexual experiences with a female duende.

Both stories found in written text from the Spanish inquisition and oral history from Mesoamerica describe beings that tended to be naughty. Some were protective while others were hostile.

== Characteristics ==
La chaneques, or duendes, can be described in different ways. Chaneques have short stature and are usually described as naked. They live in forests, rivers, or caves, and are connected to the earth and water. Mexican folklore has represented them both as evil creatures who want to cause harm or good creatures who want to help. They can communicate with animals in the jungle since they provide protection. They may not always be visible to adults but children can generally see them. They like to sing, scream, and cry.

Pedro Cholotio Temo described them as "a boy doll or a little man who hops and jumps" and is seen wearing a "wide-brimmed sombrero as the Mexicans do; his color is black." Temo believes that duendes are real and connected to the devil, similar to centuries old Spanish beliefs, and that people who practice Satanic rituals are more likely to see duendes.

When angered, Chaneques can be disruptive and physically hurt humans. In one example, the Chaneque threw a fistful of hay into the mouth of a prisoner. The prisoner scares the Chaneque by saying he will create a fire.

== In popular culture ==
Chaneques have been represented positively and negatively in Mexican media for centuries. Mexican writer Artemio de Valle Arizpe worked as a diplomat in Spain and spent time in the General Archive of the Indies where he discovered an interest in Mexican colonial history. He wrote many books about legends that existed during the Spanish colonial period. Stories during that time period tended to portray the legend of the chaneques with negative connotations. They were seen as creatures that worked with the devil. In Valle-Arizpe's story, Un duende y un perro (An Elf and a Dog), which takes place in the late 1500s, the creature that pesters Dona Luisa is described as a "demon". The duende would beat her leaving her with bruises and would torment her so much that Dona Luisa lived in fear.

In lucha libre, the ring-name "Chaneque" was used by a Micro-Estrella wrestler on the Mexican independent circuit, who currently portrays the second KeMonito in Consejo Mundial de Lucha Libre.
