= Miguel Hernández Urbán =

Mexican painter and sculptor (1936–2017)

Miguel Hernández Urbán (1936 – 2017) was a Mexican painter and sculptor noted for his monumental works in stainless steel. He trained as a sculptor at the Escuela Nacional de Artes Plásticas but moved into painting under Antonio Rodríguez Luna. He returned to sculpture in the 1980s, experimenting with stainless steel, creating monumental works with it starting in the 1990s. In 1992, he founded the Symposium on Stainless Steel Sculpture in his hometown, the first of its kind in the work, which has since attracted participants from the Americas, Europe and Asia.

== Life ==
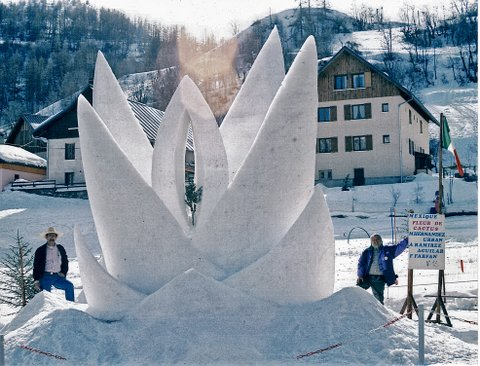
Hernández Urbán with Abel Ramírez Águilar and snow sculpture in France

Hernández Urbán was born in Tultepec, State of Mexico, a formerly rural town, now part of the Greater Mexico City area. His interest in the arts appeared in early childhood, actively participating in musical and artistic events in his hometown and having a particular interest in classical music.

In 1954, he entered the Escuela Nacional de Artes Plástica, where he specialized in sculpture. His early formation was influenced by Mexican muralism movement with teachers such as Ignacio Asúnsolo, Antonio Rodríguez Luna and Luis Ortiz Monasterio as well as working as an assistant with David Alfaro Siqueiros and José Chávez Morado. Along with sculpture, he also received training in painting, working in the studio of Rodríguez Luna, sharing his apprenticeship with painters such as Javier Arevalo, Luis Nishizawa and Susana Campos . Later, he did graduate studies at the Academy of San Carlos and traveled to France on a grant from the French government in 1969.

His work as an artist, especially his sculpture has taken him to various parts of the world. While in Thailand, the country experienced a coup d'état, however, the artists was working in a small city far from the capital.

== Career ==
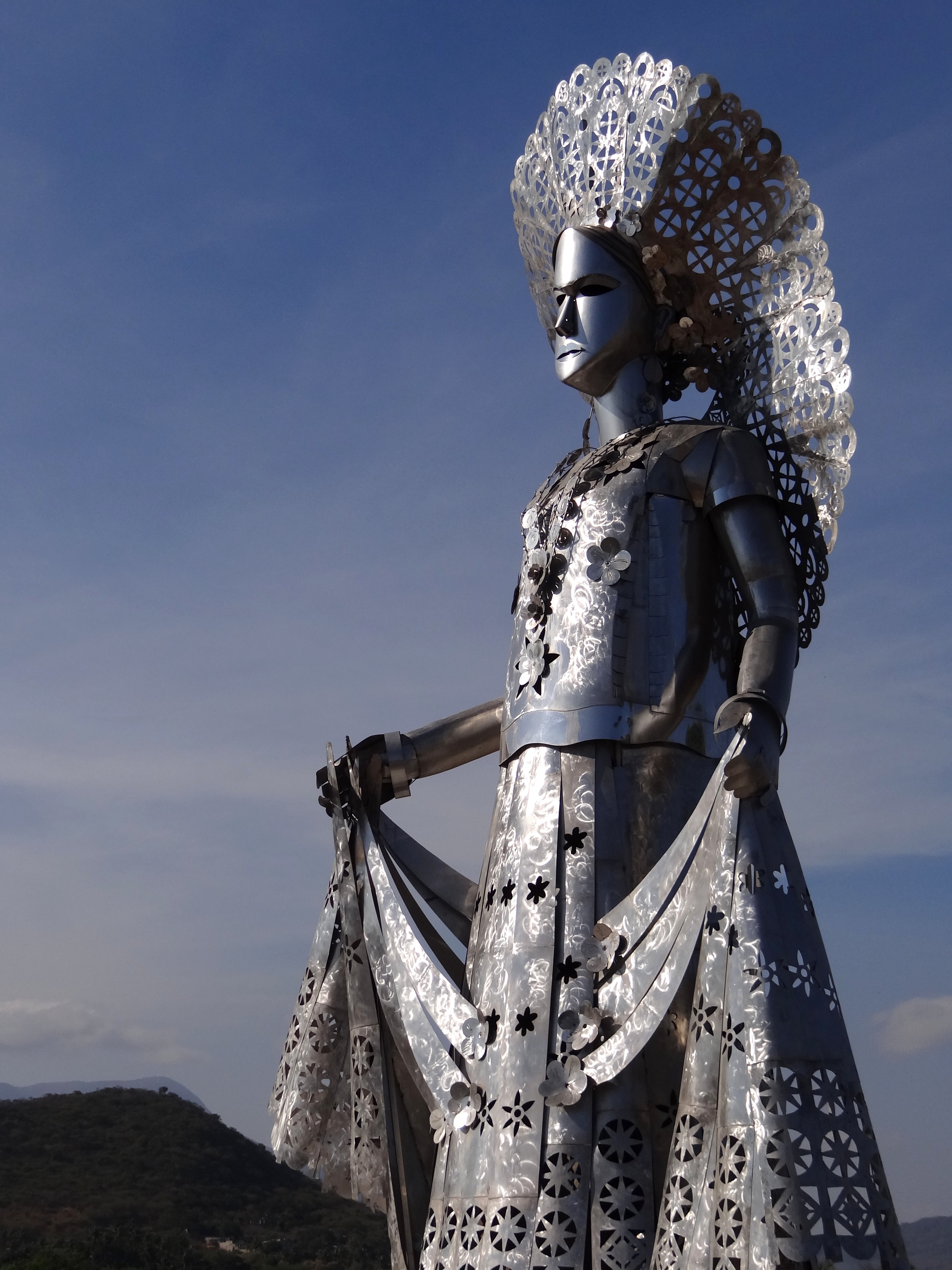
Statue of La Tehuana - Zapotec Woman - By Miguel Hernández Urbán

Hernández Urbán began his career working as an assistant instructor for sculptor Luis Ortiz Monasterio in 1959, then in 1960 he was appointed as technical consultant and university consultant at the Universidad Nacional Autónoma de México.

He has had individual exhibitions of both painting and sculpture in art galleries, cultural centers and museums in Mexico and has participated in major collective shows in Mexico and abroad such as the Pintura contemporánea mexicana in Havana, Confrontación 66 at the Palacio de Bellas Artes and Pintura, dibujo, grabado mexicano contemporáneo in Oslo. His work can be found in the collections of the Instituto Nacional de Bellas Artes, UNAM, the Organismo Internacional de la Cultura and the Museo deArte Contemporáneo in Morelia.

From 1996 he has constructed monumental sculpture for locations in the Americas, Europe and Asia. These include a sculpture in Sokogla, Thailand (2005), works for the 2008 Olympics in Beijing, a work to commemorate the 80th birthday and 60th anniversary of the reign of King Bhumibol Adulydesen of Thailand (2006), a stainless steel piece in France (2007), a black marble sculpture for the ITM University, Gwalior in Bhopal, India (2007), a stainless steel piece called Amantes for the city of Goyan, South Korea (2009) and monumental sculpture for his hometown (2009) . In 2008, he created a sculpture called La Tehuana, which is located at the main highway entrance to the city of Tehuantepec, Oaxaca. The theme of the piece is traditional, an image of a traditional Tehuana bride, which has been adopted as the symbol of an area where women play a dominant social role. However, it is a modern interpretation done in stainless steel, a style more common in the center and north of Mexico than in the south.}

In 1992, Hernández Urbán founded the first Symposium on Stainless Steel Sculpture in Tultepec, the first of its kind in the world with the aim of promoting the material to artists, artisans and other interested parties. Since then, the event is held each year, during the weeks up until the National Pyrotechnic Festival. Participants create works and exchange ideas, using sheets of stainless steel and equipment provided by the municipality, the Mexican government and private businesses. The resulting works are exhibited in various venues in Mexico and the United States and a number have been sold to cities, institutions and businesses. The event has attracted participants from Germany, Argentina, Belgium, Brazil, Bolivia, Bulgaria, Canada, China, Korea, Costa Rica, Croacia, Cuba, Ecuador, Egypt, Spain, the United States, France, Greece, Guatemala, the Netherlands, India, England, Italy, Japan, Luxemburg, Nepal, Peru, Portugal, Romania, Russia, Thailand, Turkey, Ukraine, Uruguay and Venezuela as well as Mexico.

In addition to paintings and sculpture, Hernández Urbán has produced sets and costumes for the theater, and in 2007, he designed the Centro Cultural y Ecológico, which includes an international school of sculpture. In 2006 he organized the XV Symposium and Eighth World Meeting of Symposium Directors in America, Europe and Asia in San Luis Potosí .

The artist's recognitions include first prize at the concurso Nacional de Pintura in Mexico City in 1969 and the Salón Annual de Pintura e la Plástica Mexicana. In 1987, he received the Presea Estado de México en Artes Plásticas award. At the Museum of Modern Art (Centro Cultural Mexiquense) in Toluca in 2012, the artist was honored with a retrospective called Miguel Hernández Urbán, 50 años de trabajo, 75 de vida" (50 years of work, 75 of life) . He is also a member of the Salón de la Plástica Mexicana.

== Artistry ==
During his career Hernández Urbán has produced oils, acrylics, tempera, engravings on wood and metal, drawings and sculptures. He has experimented with styles such as abstract art, stylized human figures, costumbrismo, surrealism, and figurative art. "The aesthetic value of a work of art is based essentially in its composition and outline, the creativity and personal tough that the artist knows how to stamp on his work."

As a painter, Francisco Moreno Capdevila commented that "the work of Miguel Hernández Urbán is an ascetic painting, bare of details, in which space is all. ‘Open to the infinite, the eye is submerged and wanders in the empty space in which form sometimes appears to disappear, being reduced to almost nothing. He frequently conveys a strange sensation of unprotectedness and desolation in a vastness with neither orientation nor direction. On occasions, the space seems to be an act of original creation without trace or sign, where time seems to be suspended in a tremendous attitude of waiting.’" The artist himself stated that "The handling of light has been a constant in my work. I am not an artist who is concerned to fill the canvas bur rather place in it what is necessary."

From his early work mostly in painting he moved to print making then small and monumental sculpture. He is noted today for his monumental sculptures in stainless steel, which he began experimenting with in the 1980s, moving into monumental pieces of the material in the 1990s. Hernández Urbán considers the materials as a symbol of modernity and urban life, but also appropriate to Mexican art, especially that of the Mexico City metropolitan area because of its heavy industry. In addition, the material is light, easy to transport, resistant workable into various shapes in large format and as he states "refracts the light of the sun in different matrices and forms."
