= Byron Gálvez =

Mexican artist (1941–2009)

Byron Galvez
- Born: October 28, 1941; Mixquiahuala, Hidalgo, Mexico
- Died: October 27, 2009 (aged 67)
- Education: Academia de San Carlos, Mexico City, Mexico
- Known for: Painting/sculpture
- Notable work: David Ben-Gurion Cultural Park in Pachuca, Hidalgo, Mexico
- Movement: Abstract figurativism
- Patrons: Eva Beloglovsky

Byron Gálvez (October 28, 1941 – October 27, 2009) was a Mexican artist who was primarily known for his painting but also created sculpture, including monumental works. He was born in rural Hidalgo state, to a father who played jazz music and read literature, a rarity in 1930s rural Mexico. However, it exposed Gálvez to culture, even though this led to an interest in visual art rather than musing or writing. He went to Mexico City to study art at both the undergraduate and graduate level, but never completed his degrees, opting instead to begin career after his coursework. Before his first individual exhibition, his work was criticized by Justino Fernández, but all of the paintings were sold in advance to foreign buyers including American actor Vincent Price, who called Gálvez a “Mexican Picasso.” Gálvez then managed to replace the forty five paintings for the exhibition in a week. Since then he had individual and collective exhibitions in Mexico, the United States and other parts of the world. He concentrated on painting, which he is better known for, in the 1970s and 1980s, but moved on to sculpture, including monumental works later in his career. Recognitions for Gálvez's work include membership in the Salón de la Plástica Mexicana, a retrospective at the Palacio de Bellas Artes and two books published about his life.

== Life ==
Gálvez was born in Mixquiahuala, Hidalgo and described his childhood as happy, and would not have changed it. His father, Roberto Gálvez, was a farmer and merchant, who was a music and literature enthusiast, a rarity is 1930s rural Mexico. His father played the violin in the town's jazz band, which had almost all classical instruments, making it similar to bands in New Orleans. They even composed new pieces. The artist was named after Lord Byron, and his brothers, Eliot, Aníbal and Dante, after his father's reading preferences.

This meant that Gálvez grew up in an environment that encouraged the enjoyment of the arts. However, instead of music or literature, Gálvez stated that his earliest memories related to his attraction to art and that he always wanted to be a painter. The difficulties of farm life convinced him that he needed an education and would have to move to Mexico City in order to go to school. At age sixteen he left home for the capital to study painting at the Escuela Nacional de Artes Plásticas, not knowing what the study would entail. It was far more rigorous than he expected, with thirteen-hour school days leaving only weekends to earn money to live on. He did his undergraduate studies from 1958 to 1962, then continued with the graduate courses from 1962 to 1964, specializing in painting. He did much of his studies under teachers such as Luis Nishizawa, Fernando Castro Pacheco, Francisco Moreno Capdevila, Santos Balmori, Antonio Rodríguez Luna and Antonio Ramírez. The last teacher taught him to love his studies above all else and he submitted himself to the academic rigor. This led him to become attracted to the Cubism of Picasso, and felt that the artist has opened roads which could be taken and widened. Although he specialized in painting, his interest in sculpture was also evident at this time as he was a founding member of a metal sculpture workshop at the institution along with Armando Ortega and Baltazar Martinez. Although he completed his coursework, he did not finish the other requirements needed for the degree, instead opting to start his career.

After he started his artistic career, he continued to develop as an artist, taking trip to Europe on various occasions to visit art museums and places such as Stonehenge .

Gálvez married once to art dealer Eva Beloglovsky. The couple first met in 1973, but did not meet again until two years later, when Beloglovsky bought one of his paintings and sold two more through her art gallery. At first it was a working relationship, and then evolved into a romantic one. During their marriage, they worked on a number of projects together such as multi-media presentations and charity benefits. The couple remained together until Galvez's death.

Although he began and developed much of his career in Mexico City, in his later life, the artist moved back to his rural hometown. Gálvez constructed a house and studio on the edge of a ravine in which flows the Moctezuma River. The structure has glass walls positioned for maximum light and a privileged view of a local landmark, a hill called El Elefante.

Galvez died at age 67 at Inglés Observatorio Hospital from a heart attack. His ashes were deposited a year after his death to the side of one of the sculptures at his home in Mixquiahuala.

== Career ==
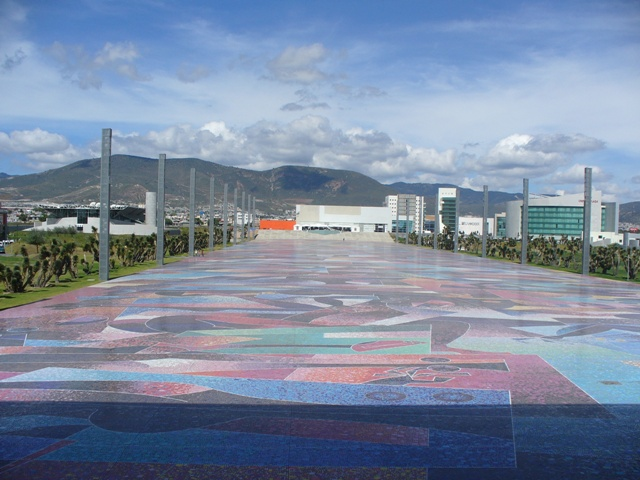
Mosaic Homenaje a la Mujer del Mundo at the Parque David Ben Gurion in Pachuca, 2005

Gálvez is best known for his oils on canvas. During his career, he exhibited individually and collectively in over sixty venues in Mexico, various cities in the United States, Europe and Latin America. In 1964, he had his first individual exhibition at the ENAP Gallery, after showing in collective exhibitions at the Palacio de Bellas Artes and private galleries along with more prominent painters such as José Chávez Morado, Alfredo Zalce, José Clemente Orozco, Diego Rivera, Carlos Orozco Romero and David Alfaro Siqueiros. Before the opening of this exhibit, his work was severely criticized by art historian Justino Fernández. Despite this, the paintings for the exhibit were bought in advance, most by American actor Vincent Price, who called Gálvez a “Mexican Picasso.” The paintings were taken out of the country one week before the exhibit, but Gálvez was not concerned about not having paintings for the show, rather he was satisfied about his work being recognized and supported. He managed to create forty five more paintings in the remaining time in order to have the exhibit.

After this individual exhibit, Gálvez had over 55 more over his career, along with participating in 75 collective exhibits. Important exhibits include the Solar 68 collective exhibition at the Palacio de Bellas Artes (1968), the Sterenberg Galleries, Chicago (1972), Eye Corporation in various US cities (1973), Polyforum Cultural Siqueiros (1978), Museo de Arte Moderno in Mexico City (1982), Harcourts Contemporary Gallery in San Francisco (1983, 1990), Art-Forum Gallery in Mexico City (1984), Bishop Gallery in Phoenix (1989), Merryl Chase Gallery in Washington, DC (1991, 1992), Suhan Galleries in San Diego (1992), Misrachi Gallery (1994) and San Francisco Theater in Pachuca (1995) . After his death, the Secretaría de Relaciones Exteriores sponsored an exhibition of his work in Tainan, Taiwan in 2011.

His works can be found in major collections in both Mexico and the United States. The strongest demand has been for his figurative work especially that produced later in his life.

Gálvez also created murals and sculptures, both small and monumental. His first mural was sculpted done in 1968 in Los Angeles. However, most of his monumental work was produced later in his career as he concentrated on painting in the 1970s and 1980s. These include a mural at the National Conservatory of Music in Mexico City (1970), a thirty-foot high sculpture in Unidad Morelos in Mexico City (1971), a hand hammered copper triptych for a private residence in Mexico City (1984), a sculpted door for a private residence (1985), a sculpture for a private home in New York (1986), Reclined Torso at the Hotel Nikko Mexico (1998), Torso I a five-foot high sculpture for the city of Pachuca (1999), Torso II a nineteen foot high sculpture at the Altiva Building, Mexico City (1999), Millennium, a bronze sculpture/fountain at the highway entrance to Pachuca (2000), a sculpture garden for Mixquiahuala, Hidalgo (2005) and the master plan and central mosaic for the David Ben Gurion Cultural Park in Pachuca (2005) . The park project, the last before his death, included not only the creation of the central mosaic, the largest pedestrian mural in the world at 345,000ft2, but also the design of the 65-acre park itself.

His other activities included the teaching of drawing at his alma mater, the creation of a program for the radio ministry of Mexico in 1973, participation in a documentary about lithography in Mexico in 1980 and the creation of several special programs for the office Radio, Television and Cinematography. In 1995, he was appointed as a member of the Consejo Nacional de Arte y Cultura of the state of Hidalgo. In 1997, he participated in a cultural exchange with the Valparaíso Foundation of Spain.

Galvez received over fifteen awards and honorary tributes during his lifetime. Recognitions for his work include first prize in sculpture in a competition organized by the Ford company in 1966, first prize in sculpture from the Instituto Nacional de Juventud in 1967, honorable mention from a contest promoted by the Comisión Federal de Acero in Mexico City (1971) and first place at the Salon Annual de la Plástica Mexicana in Mexico City in 1972, 1975 and 1986. In 1968, he became a member of the Salón de la Plástica Mexicana. In 1996, the Palacio de Bellas Artes held a retrospective called Semblanza de 30 años. Two books published about his life in 1982 and 1997. After his death, his hometown named their cultural center after him, and he was awarded a merit medal posthumously by the governor of the state.

== Artistry ==
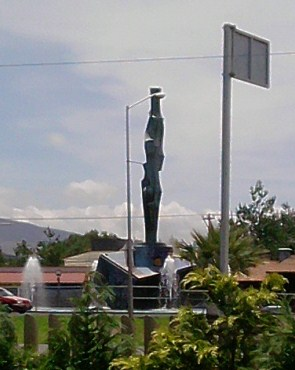
Fountain Millennium, a bronze sculpture at the highway entrance to Pachuca, 2000

Gálvez's work included painting, sculpture, etching, lithography, and drawing. For Galvez, art was spiritual and disconnected with physical logic, when only aesthetics mattered. Female figures are common, and often are sensual. He work has been influenced by the Cubism of Picasso and Georges Braque, by African and Oceanic folk art and by pre-Columbian sculpture. He preferred large scale works often bigger than seven by seven feet. He painted while listening to classical, jazz and occasionally, rock music.

Galvez's work experienced periods in which different artistic currents dominated including expressionism, abstract art and mixtures of the two. In his work, he tried to achieve a balance between figurative and abstract expression. The first stage of his painting was figurative expressionism, then abstract expressionism, under strong influence of Carlos Mérida, Rufino Tamaho, Santos Balmori, Kandinsky, Wifredo Lam and Picasso, along with some from classical painters such as Rembrandt and Caravaggio . Then for some time, he practiced abstract art, but then felt the need to draw human bodies again, especially female ones because he felt it allowed him better expression. Around 1980, he moved on to geometric figurativism, marked by the “Woman” exhibit at the Museum of Modern Art. This has also been describes as “pure chromatic constructivism.” He considered himself primarily a sculptor and painted in that fashion.

Despite their abstract quality, his paintings have an intense romanticism which arises from a mixture of nostalgia and affection, showing the influence of Rodríguez Luna and Santos Balmori. His use of color and texture shows influence from the work of Rufino Tamayo with many works showing the forms of Picasso and the color schemes of Tamayo. He considered Picasso to be the greatest artist of all time. (vision) He works in “cold colors” and used chiaroscuro (a technique from Rembrandt) to indicate movement.

As student he specialized in painting but he also created sculpture and monumental pieces. During the 1970s and 1980s, he concentrated on painting but never left sculpture completely. He began doing sculpture though his work with murals, with his initial sculptural work showing the influence of Manuel Felguérez (seen in later pieces as well) with sculptures evolving from two dimensional to three. His European travels influenced his sculptural work with exposure to the works of Henry Moore, Brâncuși and Chillida. A visit to Stonehenge influenced his sense of space and Mesoamerican influence comes by way of his cultural heritage. His sculptural work is mostly in metals, with both geometric and figurative designs, which include reliefs and bronze sculptures. There are also mixed-media pieces such as metal fountain work on a mosaic base. Latter sculptures often feature feminine figures that float in space, gazing upon the onlooker and often sensuous. His sculpting work influenced his painting and vice versa.
