= Susana Campos (artist) =

Mexican artist

Susana Campos (born 1942) is a Mexican artist whose work tends to be complex compositions in various media generally introspective or commentary on society. She has had over thirty five individual exhibitions in Mexico and participated in various collective exhibitions in Mexico and abroad. Her work has been recognized with membership in the Salón de la Plástica Mexicana since 1966, and has been written about by various noted art writers in Mexico.

== Life ==
Campos was born in Mexico City in 1942. In 1962, she entered the Escuela Nacional de Artes Plásticas (UNAM) on the recommendation of art critic and researcher Alberto Hijar. Her most important teachers there were Francisco Moreno Capdevilla and Antonio Rodríguez Luna.

In 1966 she married fellow artist Carlos Olachea, with whom she created the group Nuevos Grabadores. In 1968, the couple received a grant from the French government to work in Paris. The couple's first child, Avril was born in 1970, with the second, Ignacio, in 1973. Campos and Olachea divorced in 1974.

In 1982 she began a relationship with artist Arturo Mecalco, with whom she had her daughter Indira.

Campos lives and works in Mexico City.

== Career ==
Campos has had over thirty five individual exhibitions including those at the Instituto Francés de la América Latina (1967), the Museo de Arte Carrillo Gil (1981), a retrospective that toured Aguascalientes, Guanajuato and Zacatecas (1995), the Universidad Autónoma Metropolitana (2002) and at the Salón de la Plástica Mexicana (1974, 2012). Her work has participated in over fifty collective exhibitions in Mexico, other parts of Latin America and the United States as well as in biennales in Cuba, Puerto Rico and Ecuador.

In 1982, she formed a group called El Caracol made up of photographers, painters and graphic artists, which included Herlinda Sánchez Laurel and Consuelo Salazar. From 1988 to 1998 she worked at a studio located at the old Christ College (Antiguo Colegio de Cristo), working with painting, photography and installation with other artists, mostly from the Salón de la Plástica Mexicana.

Her work can be found in the collections of Banamex, the Museo de Arte de Sinaloa and the Guadalajara Regional Museum. It has also been reproduced in publications such as Collección de arte de Banamex, Diccionario biográfico de la pintura mexicana and in the magazines Casa del Tiempo (UAM) and Cuadernos de Comunicación.

Campos has been a member of the Salón de la Plástica Mexicana since 1966. Other recognitions include the Engraving Prize of the Salón de la Plástica Mexicana in 1968, honorary mention in painting at the Biennal of Fine Arte in Mexico in 1980 and the Painting Prize of the Salón de la Plástica Mexicana in 1990. In 2012, the Instituto Nacional de Bellas Artes y Literatura and the Salón de la Plástica Mexicana held a retrospective in her honor.

Her work has been written about by Raquel Tibol, Alberto Hijar, Berta Taracena, Antonio Rodriguez Luna, Teresa del Conde, Mónica Mayer and Macario Matus.

== Artistry ==
Campos has created drawings, engravings, acrylics on canvas and linoleum, etching, dry point, sgraffito, oil and mixed media, transitioning back and forth between abstract and figurative styles. She has also done “soft sculpture” the adding of elements to a painting such as cloth for three-dimensional effect. Her works tend to be complex compositions. Themes include introspection on her life and social observation and her main artistic influence remains teacher Antonio Rodríguez Luna.

Since the year 2000, she has worked on various pictorial series. The most important of these has been Ciudades contemporáneas, which look at the modern world and globalization.
