= Santiago Teyahualco =

Town in Tultepec municipality, Mexico

Coordinates: 19°40′N 99°08′W

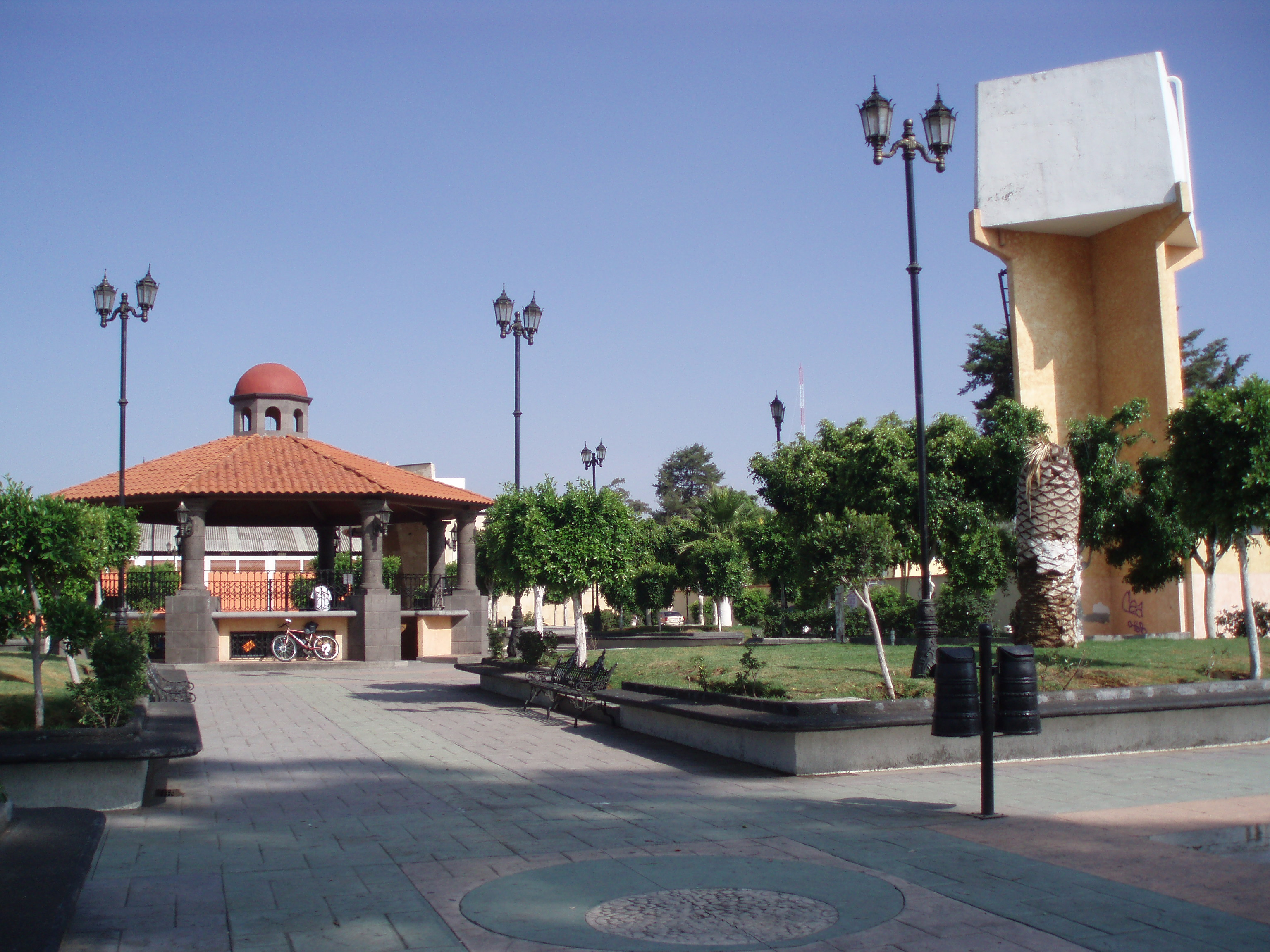

Santiago Teyahualco is the second-largest town in the municipality of Tultepec in the state of México in Mexico. At the Mexican census of 2005 the town reported a population of 47,547 inhabitants. Santiago Teyahualco, is a town located in Tultepec, State of Mexico, Mexico. It has a population of 47547 people, of which 23357 are men and 24190 women. It is characterized mainly by its feast to the patron saint of the town (Santiago Apostol) with local food, castles, bulls, and fireworks.

== History ==
The name Teyahualco comes from Toyahualco, which underwent transformations over time (they were Nahuatl names, which were distorted by the Spanish conquest and evangelization); means "in the bushes of Tule or place of bushes of Tule"; previously it was made up of four neighborhoods and places: Tecompa, Colostitla, Jajalpa and Tlamimilolpa.

Through the study and analysis of bibliographies related to the indigenous past of the first settlers of the Valley of Mexico and codices, it is now known that in this lake region there were settlements of cultures such as the Chichimeca, Tlatelolca and Otomí, which were nomadic tribes. and hunters. pilgrims.

In the annals of Cuautitlán, Chimapopolca codex, it is mentioned that in Tecpatl year one (804 AD) the Chichimecas from Cuatitlán established the dominion of this valley, due to its abundant water, flora, fauna and fishing. It is said that during these times the population was of about 12 families. During the colonial period, some original places received a Spanish name, such as: Mitra, El Solar, La Pera, Calicanto, El Magueyal, El Vado, La Huerta, Sarabia, La Presa Blanca; El Paredon and La Manzana.

== Temple of the Apostle Santiago ==
"Santiago Apóstol" Parish It is one of the four vicars that make up the Diocese of Cuautitlán, made up mostly of parishes located in the municipalities of Melchor Ocampo, Cuautitlán, Tultepec and Tultitlán in the State of Mexico. It is located in the center of the town, it is characteristic of the place for its years of antiquity, which range between 50 years old

The original temple was built by the Dominicans in the 17th century during the conquest.

Due to natural causes, the temple began to deteriorate in the fifties, until in the earthquake of 57 the roof collapsed

== Gastronomy ==
Tamales is a traditional Mesoamerican dish made of “masa” or dough (starchy, and usually corn-based), which is steamed in a corn husk or banana leaf Barbacoa; the method of cooking is pre-Columbian. Basically, it is a traditional method used to prepare various meats, especially sheep, cooked in their own juice or steamed. Carnitas;they are different portions of pork meat and are prepared by frying these pieces in lard. Sweet bread: It is the so-called 'biscuit bread' or 'sugar bread' to the variety of bread made with some particular characteristic, which commonly owe its popular name and that differentiate them from the so-called white bread or "sweet bread". The sweet bread is distinguished by its preparation and final presentation of other breads such as birotes, teleras and bolillos, and box bread.

== Traditions and holidays ==
=== Patronal feast of the Apostle Santiago ===
It takes place on July 25 of each year. The town performs rites of devotion in the Patron Saint, Santiago Apóstol, accompanied by parties such as baptisms, weddings, XV years, First Communion, Confirmation and kermes with rides, fireworks, masses, processions and food in the houses of the town. The party starts from the Sunday after July 25 where the mañanitas are sung in the early hours of the morning and culminates on Monday night, with the burning of pyrotechnic toritosOn Monday of tornafiesta, the so-called "pyrotechnic toritos" are burned where more than 50 toritos are lit

It is transported by a person, who transmits a wick, correlates with frightened people with the sparks that these bulls release.

Procession with the images of the Apostle Santiago

On May 22 and 23, the image of the apostle

It goes out in procession to the streets for 36 hours in a row, where the patron saint will pass through the 43 points that he will visit

At each point the party is different, some bring mariachis and others bring food and fireworks are lit.

=== Other social phenomena ===
1.54% of the population is indigenous, and 0.75% of the inhabitants speak an indigenous language. 0.00% of the population speaks an indigenous language and does not speak Spanish. 39.64% of the population over 12 years of age is employed (52.37% of men and 27.41% of women). Of the total population, 46.01% comes from outside the State of Mexico. 0.67% of the population is illiterate (0.48% of men and 0.85% of women). The level of schooling is 10.81 (11.02 in men and 10.60 in women). In Santiago Teyahualco there are 20290 homes. Of these, 99.47% have electricity, 98.35% have piped water, 98.61% have a toilet or toilet, 90.36% radio, 98.56% television, 94.31% refrigerator, 85.25% washing machine, 53.05% automobile, 51.73% a personal computer, 63.22% fixed telephone, 81.76% cell phone, and 36.62% Internet
