= Javier Arévalo =

Mexican artist (1937–2020)

Javier Arevalo (29 April 1937 – 12 February 2020) was a contemporary Mexican artist whose work was the subject of many exhibitions, worldwide, including in Europe, Latin America, United States, Mexico and Japan. His influence was greatest in Mexico City, and Guadalajara, Jalisco. He also taught art at the Palacio de Bellas Artes in Mexico City.

== Life ==
Arevalo was born on 29 April 1937 in Guadalajara, Jalisco, Mexico. His grandmother was a traditional healer, whose concepts stayed with him. She tutored him and did not allow him to attend school. When he was ten years old he won first prize at a contest for children in Guadalajara and began studying drawing, painting and calligraphy with a painter named Jorge Martínez, an assistant to Orozco. In 1950 he began to draw cover illustrations for textbooks for the medical school of the Universidad Autónoma de Guadalajara. In 1951 he won first place in a show for young artists in Guadalajara. During 1952-54 he studied calligraphy in a specialized school in western Guadalajara. He then spent a year traveling the coasts of Jalisco and Nayarit painting landscapes, culminating with his first show, at the Palacio de Bellas Artes. In 1955 he volunteered as a teacher of calligraphy and lithography at the Academy of San Carlos. In the next years his work was shown at the Biennale de Paris, in the Municipal Gallery of Guadalajara, and at the Museo de Arte Moderno in Mexico City.

Arevalo began his professional art training at the School of Arts and Letters at Guadalajara in 1957. Shortly after, he spent a year on the coasts of Nayarit and Jalisco to paint landscapes. In 1961, he went to the Escuela Nacional de Artes Plásticas in Mexico City, where he studied mostly under Antonio Rodríguez Luna. During his studies he also gave a number of shows throughout Latin America, in Spain, and in New York City. He graduated with a degree in Classical Arts in 1963.

== Career ==
After college, Arevalo continued to paint. His artwork has been shown throughout Latin America and in the United States, Russia, Canada, and France. These exhibitions include a 1972 show of 32 drawings at the La Nación newspaper in Costa Rica. Museums in Mexico, Switzerland, Colombia, Spain, Costa Rica, the United States, Uruguay, Japan, and Israel have acquired works of his.

In 1963, he was named director of the Fine Arts section of the Escuela de Bellas Artes of the Universidad de Morelia in Michoacán.

His recognitions included the 1963 Nuevos Valores Award, the 1966 National Award of Art and was accepted as a member of the Salón de la Plástica Mexicana. His works participated in a number of competitions, winning first prize at the Tokyo Biennale in 1970, and a watercolor award at the first National Certamen of Plastic Arts. In 1993, his painting Caballero en un caballo ensillado won an award at the tenth Biennial of Latin America and the Caribbean in San Juan, Costa Rica. In 1990, a retrospective of his work was held at the Palacio de Bellas Artes.

== Artistry ==
Arévalo stated "I know one has to be deeply grounded in reality to be able to capture magic." During the 1960s, he was considered an important draftsman, along with José Luis Cuevas and Francisco Toledo. He was one of the pioneers of magical realism in painting.
