= Xaltocan Municipality =

Xaltocan
- Municipality
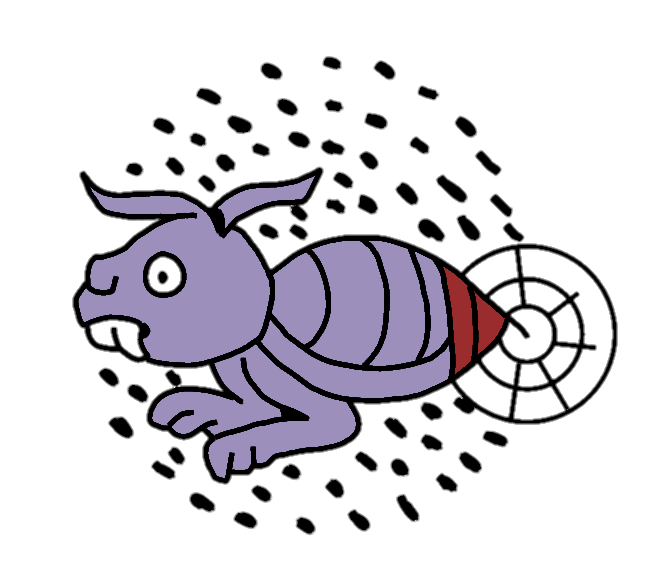
- Coat of arms

- Location within Tlaxcala Location within Mexico
- Coordinates: 19°25′N 98°12′W
- Country: Mexico
- State: Tlaxcala
- Municipal seat: Xaltocan, Tlaxcala
- Time zone: UTC-6 (Central)

Xaltocan is a municipality in the Mexican state of Tlaxcala.

The seat is at Xaltocan, Tlaxcala.
