= Tultepec =

Tultepec Municipio de Tultepec
- Municipality
- Municipality of Tultepec
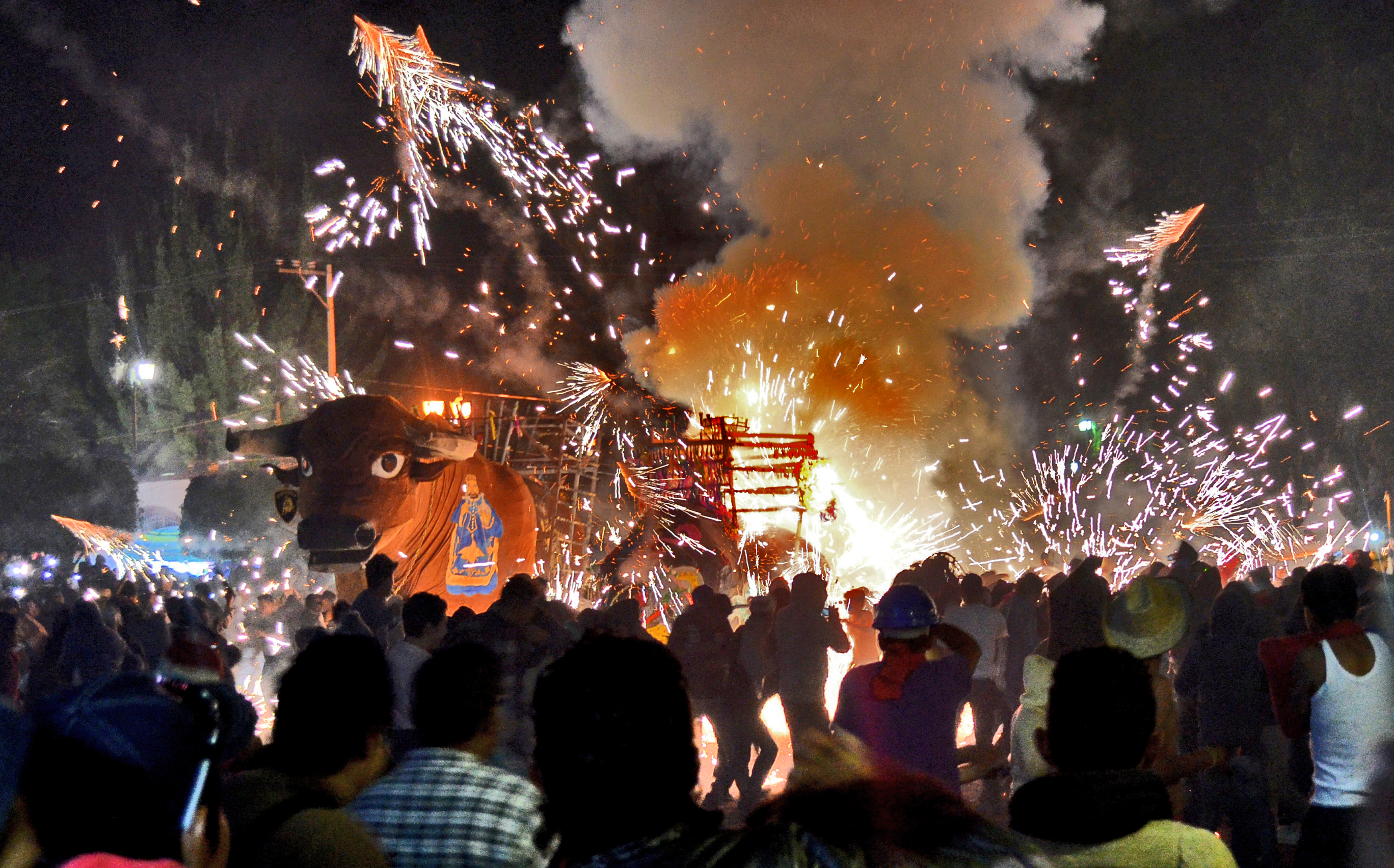
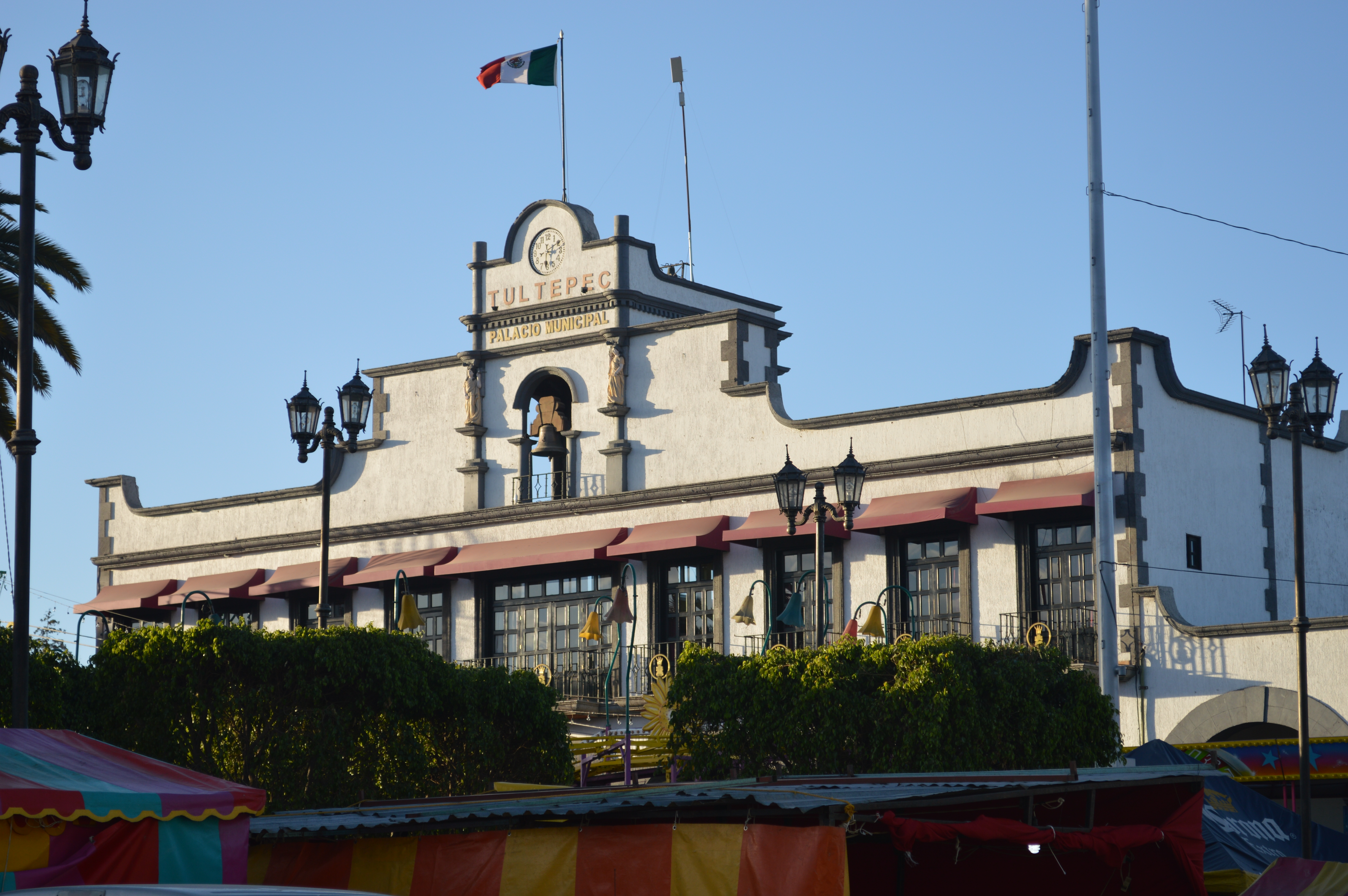
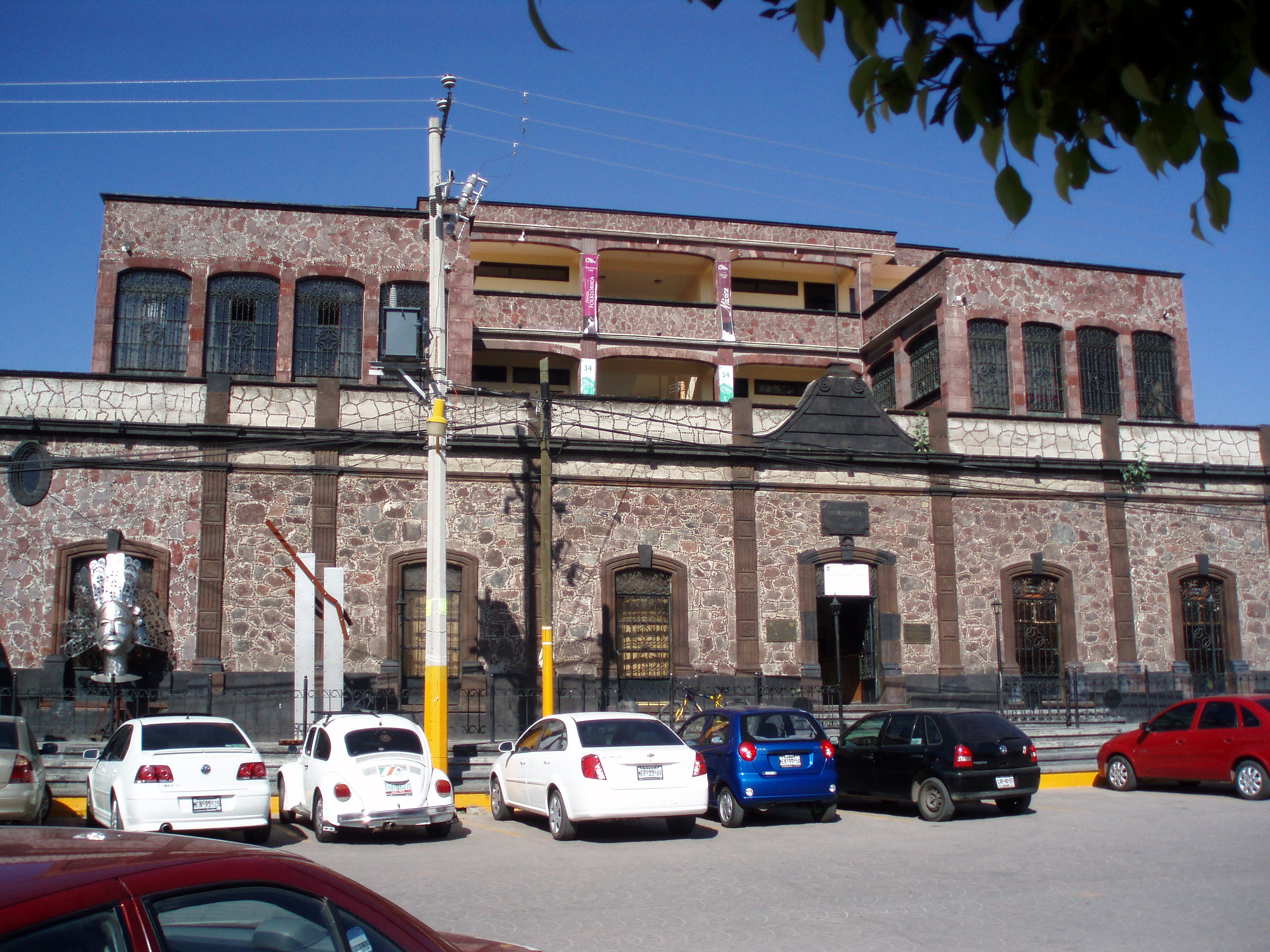
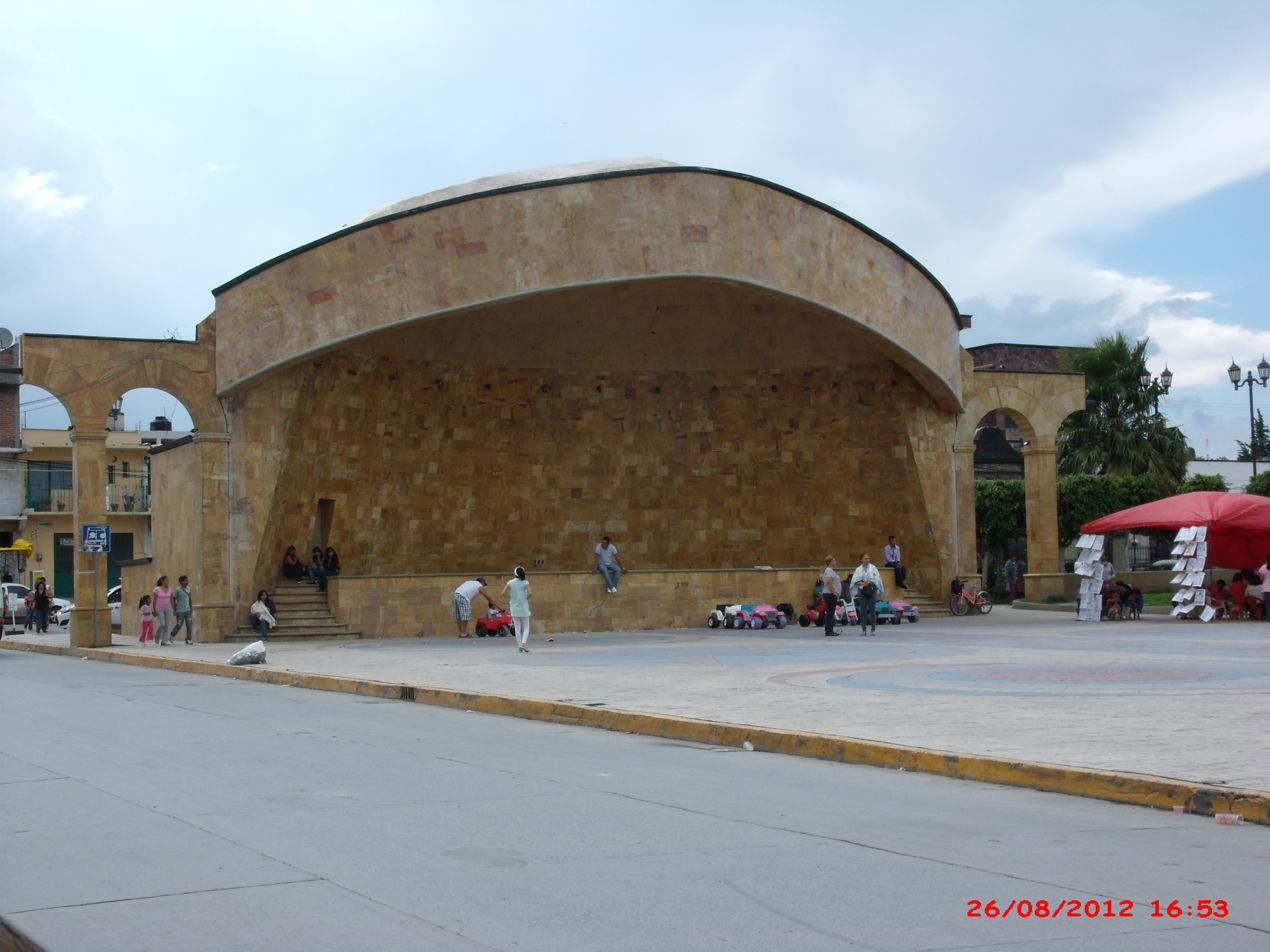
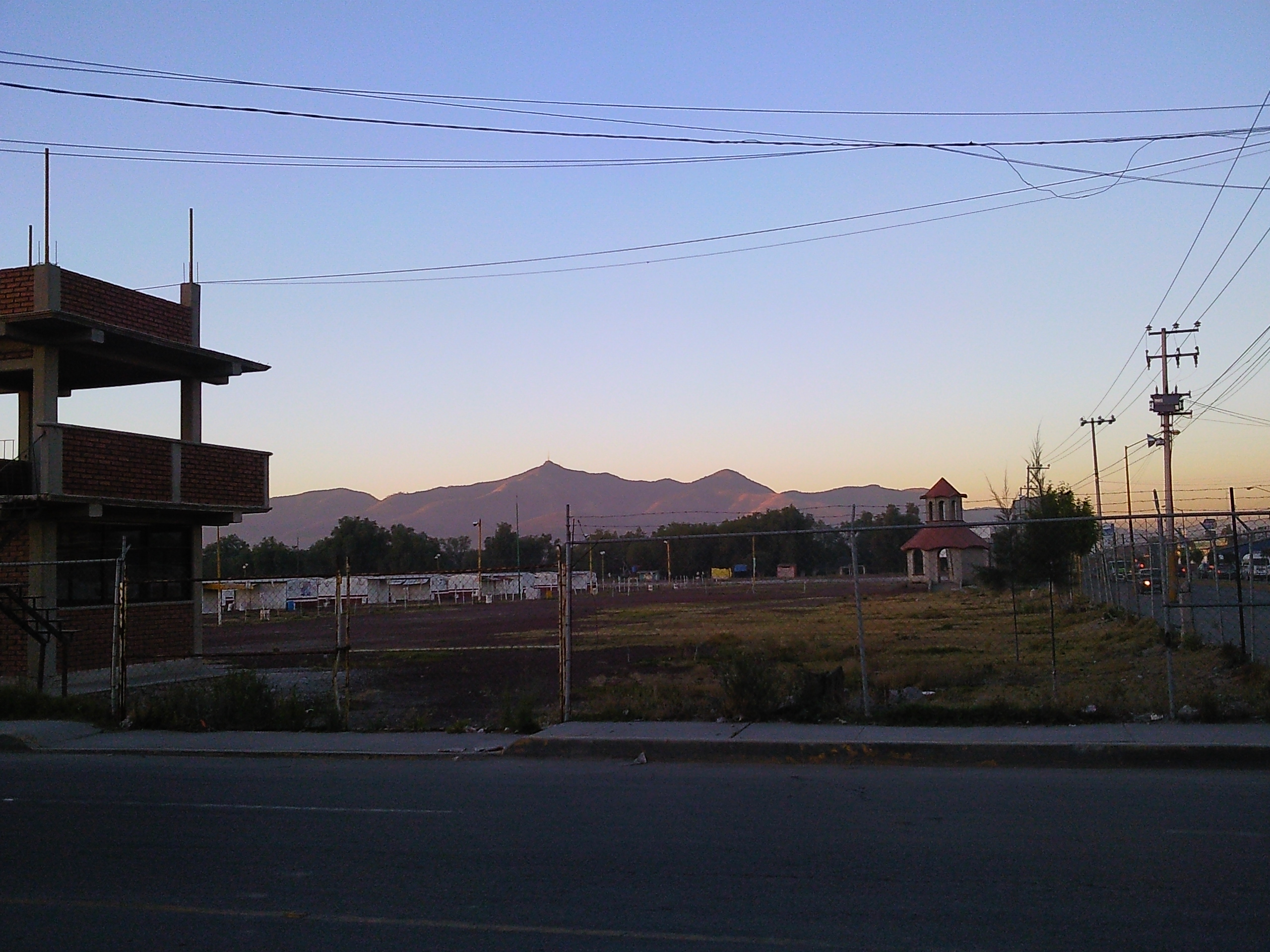
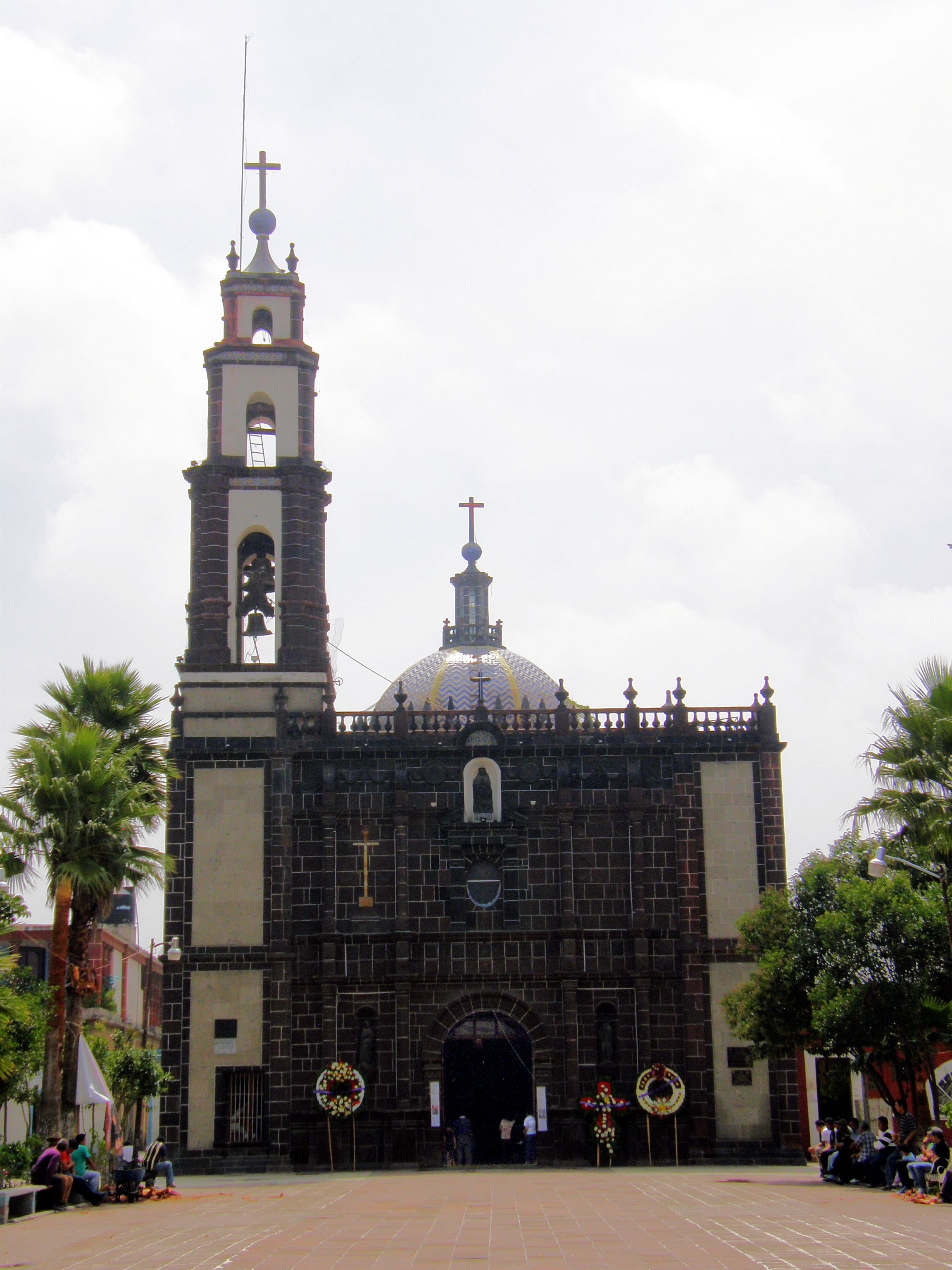
- Clockwise, from top: Fireworks show, Fine Arts school, fireworks market, Our Lady of Loreto Church, Acoustic shell, municipal palace

- Coat of arms

- Location within Mexico
- Coordinates: 19°41′06″N 99°07′41″W
- Country: Mexico
- State: Mexico State
- Municipality: Tultepec

Government
  - Municipal President: Ramón Sergio Luna Cortes (2006–2009)

Area
  - Land: 25.856 km^{2} (9.983 sq mi)
- Elevation: 2,250 m (7,380 ft)

Population (2010)
  - Total: 91,808
  - Density: 3,550.7/km^{2} (9,196.4/sq mi)
- Time zone: UTC-6 (CST)

Tultepec (Nahuatl languages: Tōltepec, Otomi: Nt‘ōkwä) is a city and municipality located in State of Mexico, Mexico. It lies directly north of Mexico City in the northeastern part of the State of Mexico, making it part of the Greater Mexico City urban area. The name comes from Náhuatl meaning 'hill of the 'tule'. The census of 2005 reported a population of 57,586 for the city and 110,145 for the municipality as a whole. The municipality is known for its pyrotechnics industry.

== The city ==
Parade of toritos on the streets of the historic center for the feast of John of God

The area was first settled by the Chichimecas, followed by the Otomis in the seventh century. After the Spanish invasion, Tultepec was given to Alonso Ávila along with the current municipalities of Zumpango, Xaltocán, Huehuetoca, Coyotepec, Teoloyucan and others, as part of the Encomienda de Cuautitlán. The modern town of Tultepec began to take shape around 1610 in the valley next to a small elevation called San Martín. Franciscans came to evangelize the new community, dedicating it to the Nativity of Holy Mary and constructing a temple in 1618. This temple, later a parish, was renovated between 1948 and 1955.

The town and municipality boast of a number of musicians and painters including Hernesto Urbán Rodríguez (1894), Ricardo Vázquez Pineda (1894), Victor Manuel Urbán Silva (1894), Andrés Urbán (1870) and Prudenciano García (1880), as well as modern composers such as Victor Urbán Velasco, Gerardo Urbán Velásco, Francisco Vázquez García, Francisco Romero Linares, and J. Isabel Vázquez Solano. Better-known painters include Miguel Hernández Urbán, Joaquín González Romero, Margarito González Solano, Gregorio González Solano, and Albino Luna Sánchez. It is the home of a folk dance group that has toured the United States and Europe.

== Fireworks industry ==
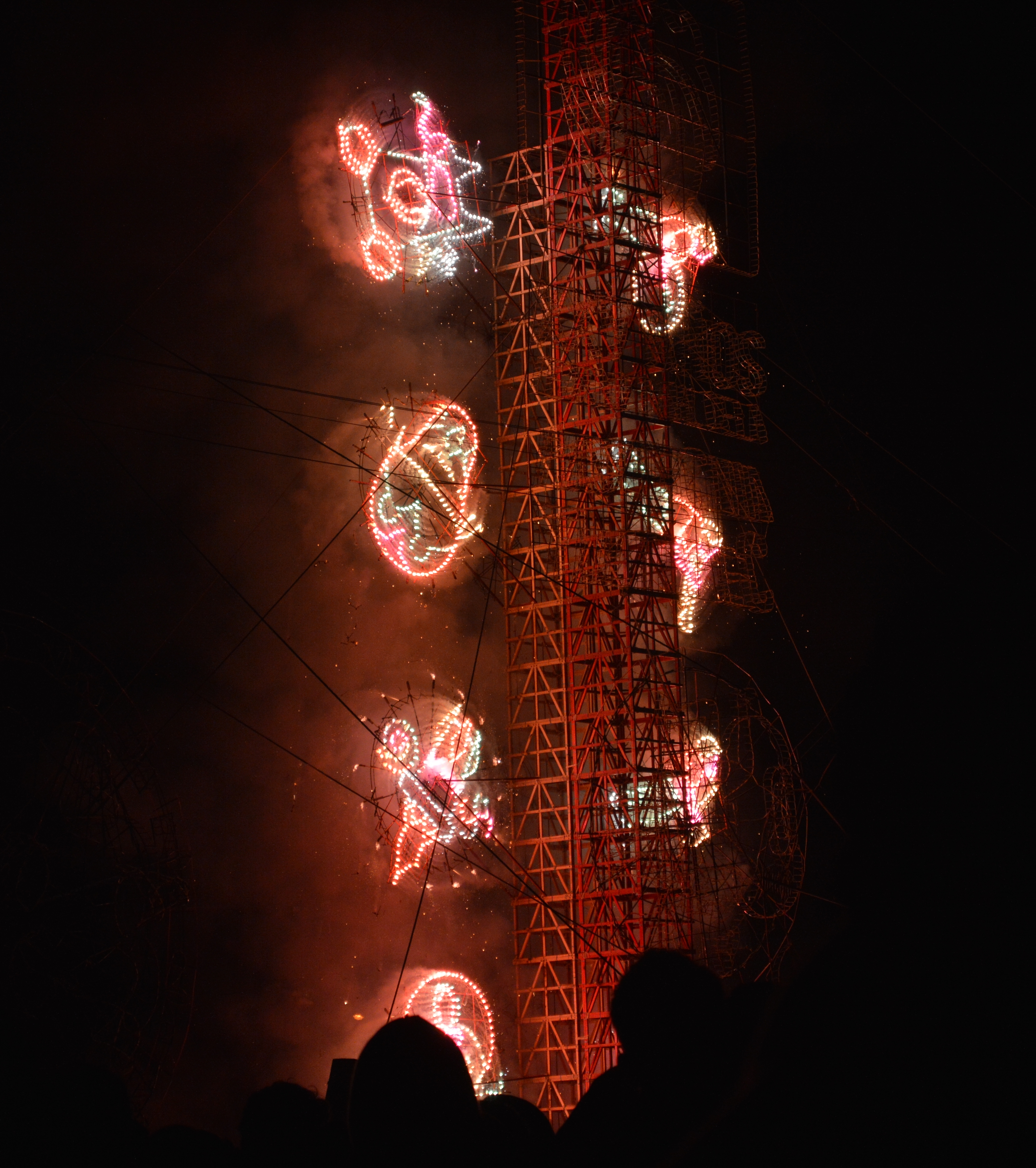
Castillos at the National Fireworks Festival

In the past, when the town was still rural, the economy was based on products such as pulque, animal feed, salt and tequesquite as well as domestic fowl and other small animals, mostly to be sold in Mexico City.

Nowadays, the pyrotechnics industry is the major industry in Tultepec. Every year, the town throws a weeklong festival with fireworks competitions among various producers.

Many pioneers in pyrotechnics came from Tultepec, including Agustín, Miguel and Gregorio Fiesco (1880); José Solano Urbán (1900–1920), who revolutionized firework sets and castles; Felipe Reyes, who worked on the colors red and yellow around 1920; Ángel Guadalupe Flores, who around 1920 invented star fireworks and sparklers as well as several types of rockets; Cirilo Sánchez (1920), who worked on aerostatic balloons; as well as Tomás Romero, Ángel Urbán Rivero, Marcos Romero, and Felipe Fiesco, who innovated such items as the electric target, the spider bomb, and two-figure wheels between 1930 and 1934.

The city and municipality hosts the annual National Pyrotechnic Festival.

=== 2016 fireworks explosion ===
On 20 December 2016, at least 36 people were killed and 59 were injured when fireworks exploded at the San Pablito Market. Previous explosions in 1997, 1998, 1999, 2005, 2006, 2007, 2010 and 2012 had killed a total of 20 people.

== Municipality ==
As municipal seat, Tultepec has governing jurisdiction over the communities of Guadalupe, Rancho el Cuquío, Maite (Granja Maite), San Antonio Xahuento, Rancho San Joaquín, Santiago Teyahualco, Rancho la Virgen, Ejido Tultepec, Rancho Nodín, Paraje Trigo Tenco, Ejido de Teyahualco, Hacienda Real de Tultepec, Unidad CTM San Pablo, Barrio de San Martín, Ejido San Pablito (Paraje San Pablito), Colonia las Brisas, La Rinconada, La Saucera, Cajiga (Ejido de Tultepec), El Progreso, Colonia la Aurora and Fraccionamiento Paseos de Tultepec II.

The municipality is bordered by the municipalities of Nextlalpan, Melchor Ocampo, Tultitlán, Coacalco and Cuautitlán. Most of the area is a plain with small hills, the largest of which is called Otzolotepec. Temperatures range between 6 and 28 °C, but much of the local ecosystem has been destroyed due to urbanization.

The territory surrounding the town of Tultepec used to be much larger. The current municipality took shape at the end of the 19th century and the beginning of the 20th when areas were split off to create the current municipality of Melchor Ocampo. The municipal palace was constructed in 1870. Tultepec municipality currently has an area of 19.02 km^{2} (7.344 sq mi). Another major town in the municipality is Santiago Teyahualco.

Outside the main town, there is still some agricultural activity including the raising of animal feed, beans, corn, wheat and alfalfa, and the raising of animals such as cattle and pigs, but agricultural land is shrinking. There are over 79 manufacturing establishments in the municipality including Asfalto Industria and Nacional Constructora. Communities involved in the manufacture of fireworks also serve as tourist attractions.
