= National Pyrotechnic Festival =

Annual celebration in Tultepec, Mexico

Coordinates: 19°41′6.29″N 99°7′43.38″W

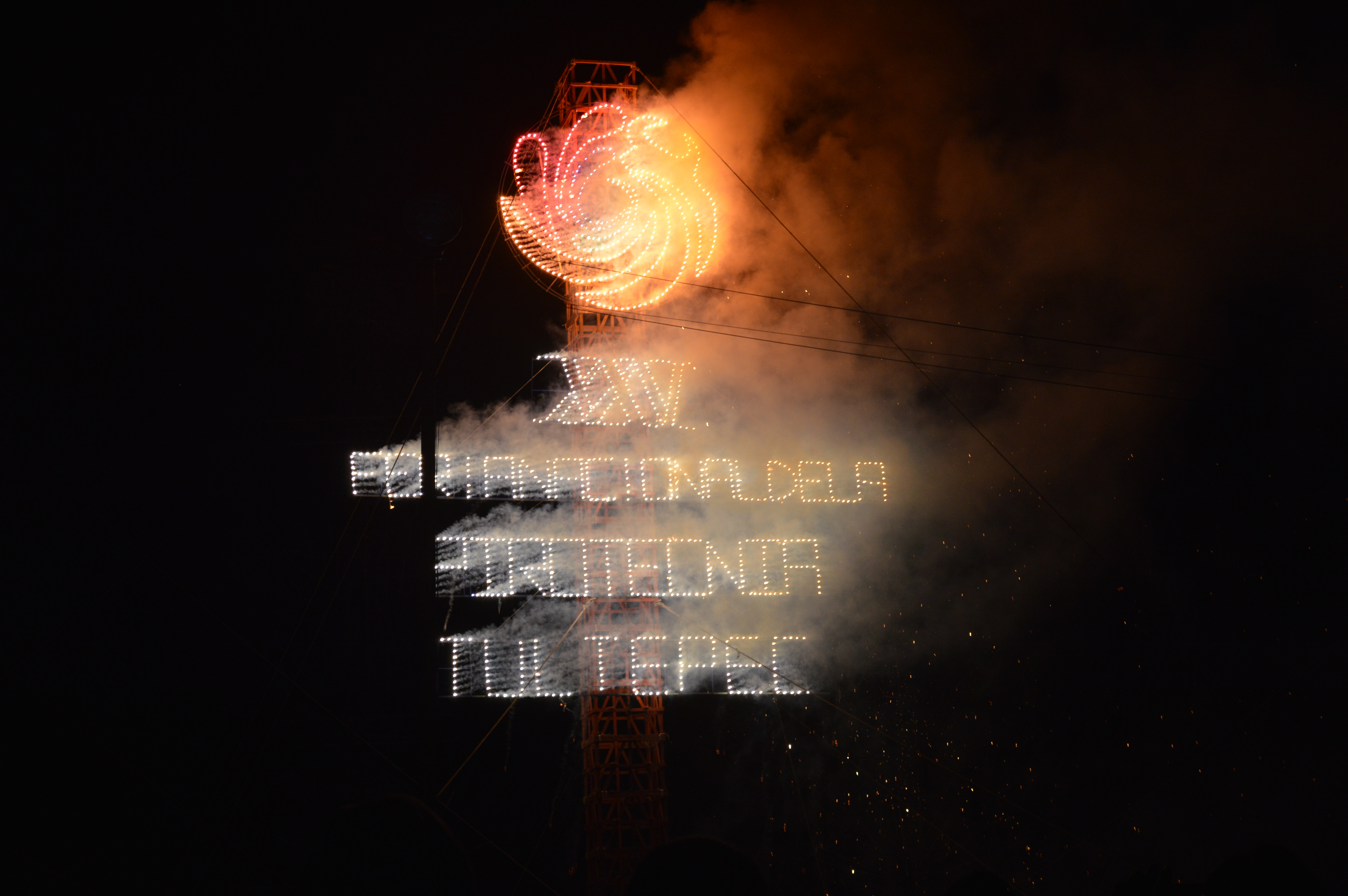
A fireworks "castle" lit announcing the start of the 2013 festival

The National Pyrotechnic Festival (Spanish: Feria Nacional de la Pirotecnia), which takes place in Mexico, is an annual event to promote the country's tradition of production and use of fireworks. It began as celebration in honor of John of God, the patron saint of fireworks makers, in the municipality of Tultepec, State of Mexico, which produces about three quarters of all Mexico’s fireworks. The main event, a parade of toritos—or bull-shaped frames with fireworks attached to them—began in the mid 19th century. The modern national festival began in 1989 and consists of various events, including fireworks competitions. However, the main event remains that of the toritos; about 250 of which were paraded along the streets of Tultepec during the 2013 festival.

== Events of the festival ==
Setting off a "torito" as part of the feast of John of God, the precedent and most popular event of the Festival

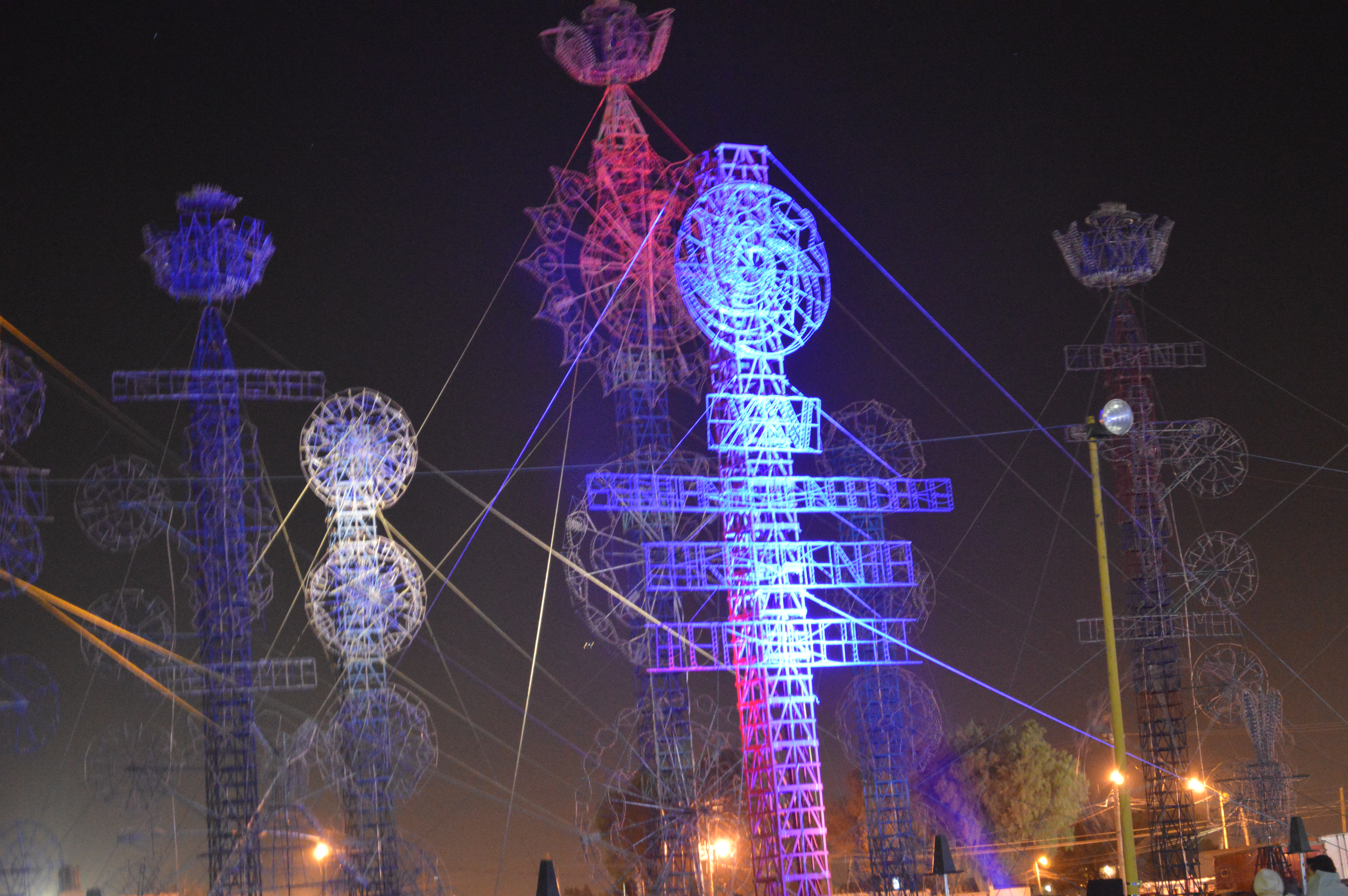
Fireworks "castles" waiting to be set off for a competition

The National Pyrotechnic Festival lasts for seven days and attracts more than 100,000 visitors to the municipality, bringing in anywhere from five to ten million pesos. Although the event started locally, it is now open to all fireworks makers in Mexico, especially attracting craftsmen from San Pedro de la Laguna, San Mateo Tlalchichilpan, and Almoloya de Juárez.

There are three main events in addition to amusement rides, concerts, dance, the release of sky lanterns, and regional food. These events are split between the town center of Tultepec and the fairgrounds in the San Antonio Xahuento neighborhood.

The first of the main events is a contest of castillos (castles). Such castillos are frames made of wood, reed and paper to which various fireworks are affixed. The fireworks are set off to make images and/or parts of the castillo structure spin and move. The castillos created for this event measure between 25 metres (82 ft) and 30 metres (98 ft) high, requiring about fifteen days to build. When ignited, they take between 20–30 minutes to sequence through all of their features.

The second, oldest and most important event is the "pamplonada." Named after the Running of the Bulls in Pamplona, Spain, these "little bulls" or "toritos" are also fireworks frames. These brightly painted frames are constructed from such materials as wood, reed, a hard papier-mâché called cartonería, wire, and more. They can measure anywhere from 50 centimetres (20 in) to over 3 metres (9.8 ft) in height costing between 400 and 20,000 pesos to make. The larger toritos are made by groups of thirty to forty people because of the cost and can have as many as 4,000 fireworks on them. The toritos are given names such as "El Chico," "Sagitario Toro Maya," and "Monster." In the 2013 event, over 250 toritos were registered to participate. The toritos are paraded on March 8, in honor of John of God, the patron saint of fireworks makers. The toritos proceed down the various streets of Tultepec, setting off their fireworks for five to six hours, until they arrive at the main plaza of the town.

The last of the major events is another contest, involving performances that combine fireworks and music.

== History ==
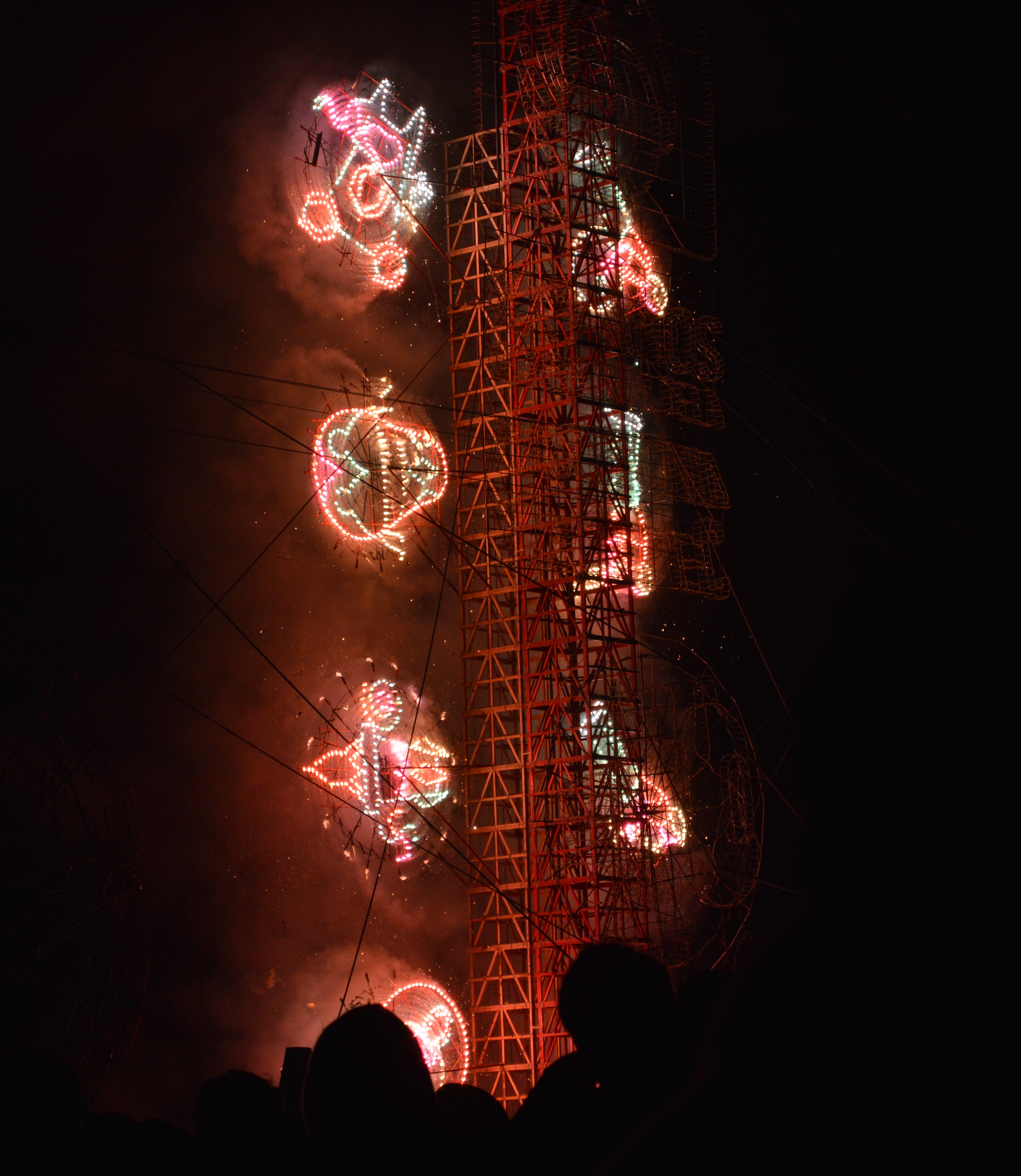
Images set off on a fireworks castle

The antecedent for the modern event began in the mid 19th century, as a feast day for John of God, celebrated on March 8. This was begun by a guild dedicated to the craft. From then up to the present day, this has consisted of the parading of toritos through the streets of the town.

In 1988, a major fire at the La Merced Market in Mexico City prompted city authorities to ban the manufacture and wholesale of fireworks in the city limits. This was a large economic blow to Tultepec and the festival was organized in 1989 as a way to compensate, increasing sales as well as attracting tourism to the municipality. Since that time, the festival has grown to national status, with participants from various parts of Mexico. The festival also works to reaffirm community ties among the various neighborhoods as well as the municipality’s traditions and identity despite industrialization.

== Tultepec ==
Parade of toritos in the streets of the historic center

The making of handcrafted fireworks is part of the identity of the municipality. In the colonial period, the area made gunpowder as the raw materials required for its production were available locally. The making of fireworks began about 150 years ago. About sixty percent of the municipality’s population of 110,000 is involved in some way in the craft, with about 2,000 directly making fireworks and the rest involved in frame building, supplies, distribution and more. The fireworks made here and other parts of the State of Mexico such as Almoloya de Juárez, Texcoco, Aculco and Zumpango, support 40,000 families directly or indirectly. Tultepec alone accounts for about almost half of all fireworks production in Mexico.

Most of the fireworks are made with entire families laboring in the workshops, with about three hundred workshops registered with authorities. Fireworks have been produced by generations of artisans, who consider it both an art and a science. The making of rockets was originally done with reeds, then leather and finally with paper, which remains the medium today. The children of the artisans now get specialized training and even degrees, which has lent the profession more respect as well as raised the quality of its output. However, there is competition from Chinese made fireworks, which can be up to thirty percent cheaper.
