= Xaltocan, Tlaxcala =

Human settlement in Tlaxcala, Mexico

Coordinates: 19.417°N 98.200°W

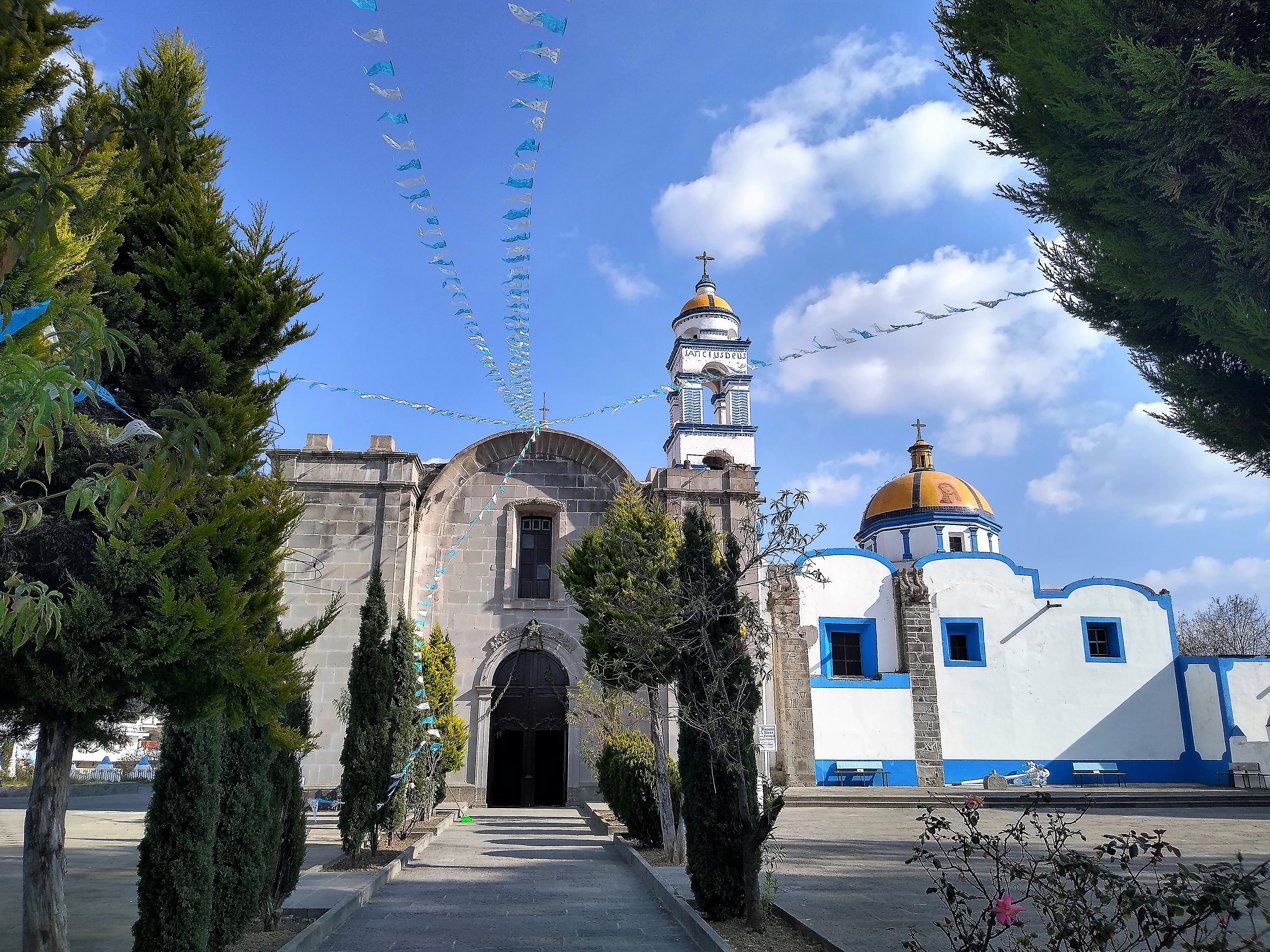
Church of Saint Martin of Tours

Xaltocan (also known as Jaltocan or Jaltocán) is in Xaltocan Municipality in the Mexican state of Tlaxcala. The name can mean either of two things in the Nahuatl language: either 'sandy ground of spiders' or 'where sand sowing'. Xaltocan is also the name of the municipal seat.

== History ==
Xaltocan was inhabited in Pre-Columbian times and is still populated today. In ancient times, its people who were comparable to the Aztecs of Mesoamerica, were rigorously religious, having temples and sacred sites in which they would worship their native gods, as well as performing occasional rituals that involved an offering of human sacrifice, among other similar ceremonies. These human sacrifices often included women from surrounding regions, but men were not excluded from sacrifice to the gods. The human sacrifices were mostly performed in front of a Cuauhxicalli, which was a sacred statue in the shape of a soldier or warrior.

== Climate ==
The climate in Xaltocan is mostly tropical, with warm temperatures most of the year. Heavy rain falls during the summer months. The average temperature is almost thirty degrees Celsius, while the average rainfall per year is one hundred and fourteen millimeters.

== Flora and fauna ==
The tree species that can be found in Xaltocan include ashes, willows, weeping willows and tepozán. Higher up on the island, Chihuahua Pines can be found, among other trees. In urban areas, there are several species of introduced trees, including cypress, the casuarina and eucalyptus trees.

Even though the urban part of the island has greatly expanded in recent times, several wild species of fauna still exist in these areas. These types of fauna include rabbits, hares, ringtails, and the common opossum. Birds such as crows, sparrowhawks and quails can also be found.

== Population and religion ==
- 1970: The population of Xaltocan in 1970 numbered around 7,000 people, which represented 1.7% of the state's population.
- 1980: The population in 1980 had risen, though slightly, to 7,123, which was approximately 1.3% of the population of the state.
- 1990: The population had by this time in 1990 risen to almost 8,800, an increase of about 27% since 1970.

Studies taken during 1990 suggest that most (97%) of the population are of the Roman Catholic faith, 2% are Protestant or Evangelical and the remainder profess other religions or beliefs.

== See also ==
- Municipalities of Mexico
