= Francisco Moreno Capdevila =

Mexican artist

Francisco Moreno Capdevila (January 18, 1926 – May 13, 1995) was a Mexican artist of Spanish origin, best noted for his engraving and other graphic work. He came to Mexico as a political refugee after the fall of the Republicans in 1939. Unlike other Spanish artists of his generation, he was young when he arrived and did not begin studying or working in art until he was in Mexico. His work generally had cultural and political themes, but also included a portable mural about the fall of Tenochtitlan. This work was at the Museo de la Ciudad de México for thirty years, but today it is at the law school of the Universidad Nacional Autónoma de México. His work was recognized by membership in various honor societies, including the Salón de la Plástica Mexicana and the Academia de Artes.

== Life ==
Capdevila was born in Barcelona, Spain. As he was only thirteen years old when he and his family fled Spain after the fall of the Republicans, arriving to Mexico in 1939 as a political refugee. Unlike other Spanish Republican artists in exile, he had not studied art before coming to Mexico. He began his career studying painting with Santos Balmori and engraving with Carlos Alvarado Lang . He eventually became a Mexican citizen.

He died in Mexico in 1995.

== Career ==
Capdevila spent most of his career in the graphic arts, working in workshops and print enterprises, studying and working with graphic artists such as Carlos Alvarado Lang, Gabriel Fernández Ledesma and Francisco Díaz de León. From 1946 to 1959, he worked as a draftsman and engraver at the Imprenta Universitaria, which was the editorial branch of the Secretaría de Educación Pública.

He began exhibiting his graphic work in 1952 in Mexico and abroad, with his first individual exhibition at the Salón de la Plástica Mexicana in 1962. He had an individual exhibition at the Museo de Arte Moderno in 1981. In 1987, the Palacio de Bellas Artes held a retrospective called Visión multiple, with examples of his paintings, engravings and tapestries.

His first and most significant mural was created in 1964 for the Museo de la Ciudad de Mexico, called Destruction of the City of Mexico-Tenochtitlan. It is a concave portable piece, painted in acrylics over aluminum panels, measuring three meters tall and nine meters wide. His experience as a refugee from Franco affected the composition of the work. The mural was on permanent display for thirty years, when relegated to a back patio. In the mid-1990s it was restored and sent to Universidad Nacional Autónoma de México, where it is now displayed at the law school.

Capdevila also worked as an engraving teacher with the Escuela Nacional de Artes Plásticas, in charge of the intaglio workshop until 1979.

His prominence, especially in the graphic arts led to membership in various prestigious organizations. From 1954 to 1974, he was a prominent member of the Sociedad Mexicana de Grabadores. In 1960, he became part of the Nuevas Generaciones de la Plástica Mexicana group and became a member of the Salón de la Plástica Mexicana in 1961. He became a member of the Academia de Artes in 1988. He was also a member of the Grupo Nuevos Grabadores and the Salón Independiente.

In 2012, a biography was published, researched and written by historian Fabiola Martha Villegas Torres.

== Artistry ==
Capdevila did engraving, painting, drawing, illustration and various other graphic arts. He carved wood with various techniques, using blades, gouges, burin and chisels. He worked with linoleum and woods in the die sinking technique as well as punch sinking technique in metals such as a copper, iron and aluminum. He also created serigraphs and photoserigraphs.

He did not abandon politics after arriving to Mexico, documenting events such as the railroad strikes of 1958 and the student uprising in 1968 in his work, found in two publications: Represión and Luz y Tenieblas.

His work also dealt with cultural issues of his time, as a member of the Generación de la Ruptura and Los Interioristas. In 1972, he produced a series of prints with the title of Monte Albán, employing new methods noted for their technical expertise. They were a focus of an exhibit in the Museo del Pueblo in Guanajuato in 1990.

Antonio Rodríguez Luna described his painting as “profound without being cryptic, clear in spite of its contempt for the obvious.”
