= Luis Nishizawa =

Mexican artist (1918–2014)

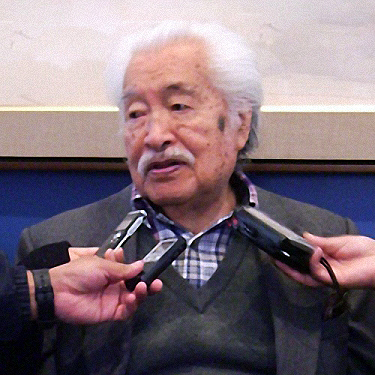
- Luis Nishizawa in 2006
- Born: Luis Nishizawa Flores; February 2, 1918; Cuautitlán, State of Mexico, Mexico
- Died: September 29, 2014 (aged 96); Toluca, State of Mexico, Mexico
- Education: Academy of San Carlos
- Known for: Painting (landscapes, murals), ceramics
- Movement: Mexican muralism, Expressionism, Abstract art, Figurativism, Engraving
- Spouse: Eva Zepeda

Luis Nishizawa Flores (February 2, 1918 – September 29, 2014) was a Mexican artist known for his landscape work and murals, which often show Japanese and Mexican influence. He began formal training as an artist in 1942 at the height of the Mexican muralism movement but studied other painting styles as well as Japanese art.

In addition to painting canvases and murals, including murals made with ceramics, he was a professor of fine arts at the National Autonomous University of Mexico (UNAM) from which he received an honorary doctorate. The State of Mexico, where he was born, created the Museo Taller Luis Nishizawa in Toluca to honor and promote his life's work.

== Biography ==
Luis Nishizawa Flores was born on February 2, 1918, at the San Mateo Ixtacalco Hacienda in the municipality of Cuautitlán, State of Mexico. His father, Kenji Nishizawa, was Japanese and his mother, María de Jesús Flores, was Mexican. Since he was a child, he was introverted and solitary, spending his childhood tending cattle for his family. The family moved to Mexico City in 1925, where Nishizawa learned to create jewelry and studied music with a teacher named Rodolfo Halfter.

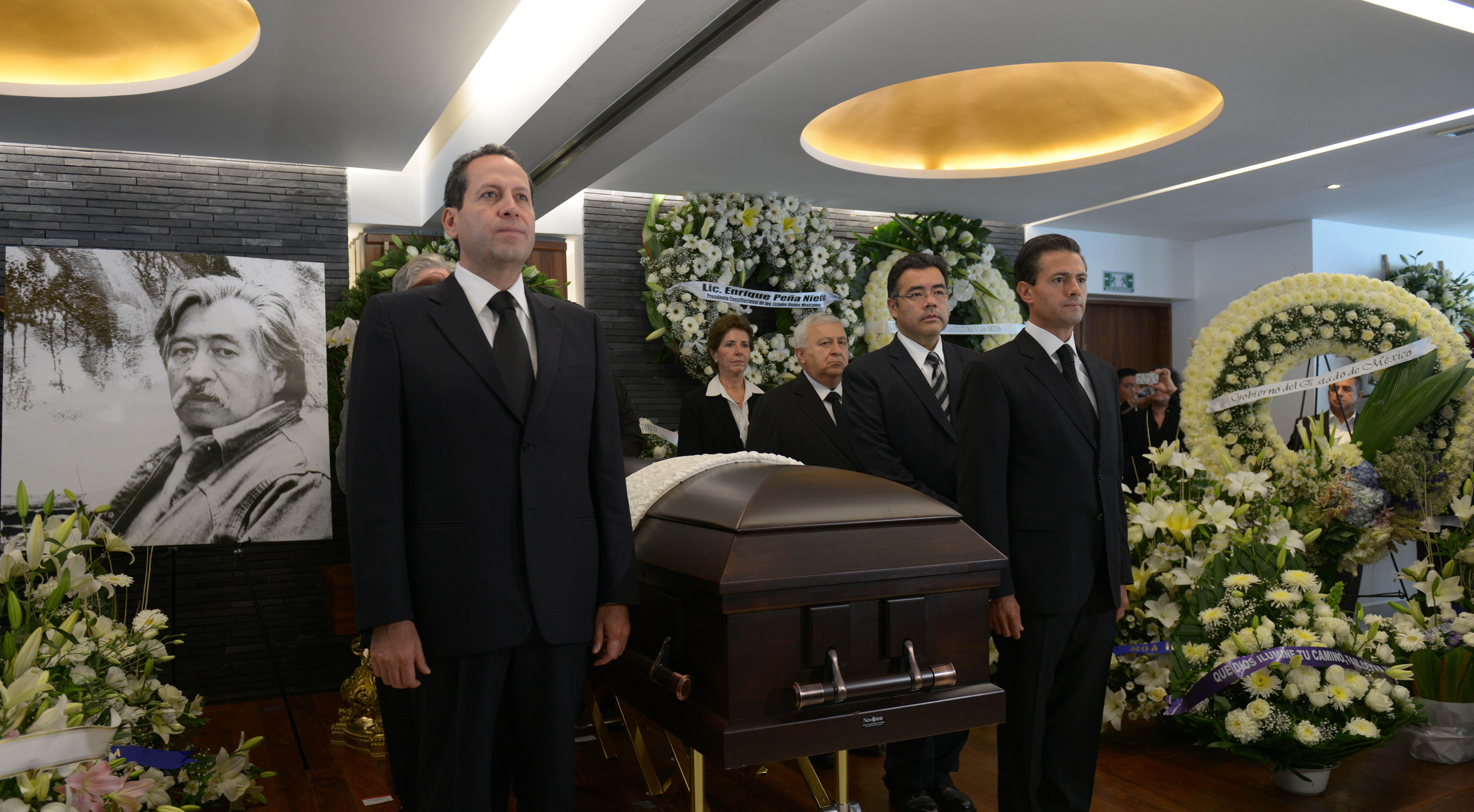
Funeral of Luis Nishizawa. President Enrique Peña Nieto (right) attended to pay his respects.

Although he had interest in art at age 15, he began artistic training at the Academy of San Carlos in 1942, when he was 24, at the height of the Mexican muralism movement. He learned to paint landscapes as well as abstract art and graphics with an interest in the art tradition of Japan. Either as teachers or working for them as assistants, Nishizawa had various mentors such as José María Velasco, Julio Castellanos, José Chávez Morado, Alfredo Zalce and Benjamin Correa. Although nationalism was the prevailing sentiment in artistic production in the 1940s, he studied other movements such as expressionism, abstract art and figurativism as well. He received his master's degree in fine arts in 1947.

In 1955, he began teaching art at the UNAM's National School of Plastic Arts.

In 1963, he studied engraving with Yukio Fukazawa and took another course in engraving at the Center for Japanese Artists in Tokyo.

He married Eva Zepeda in 1964, with whom he had four children.

Luis Nishizawa died in Toluca, State of Mexico, on September 29, 2014, at age 96.

== Career ==
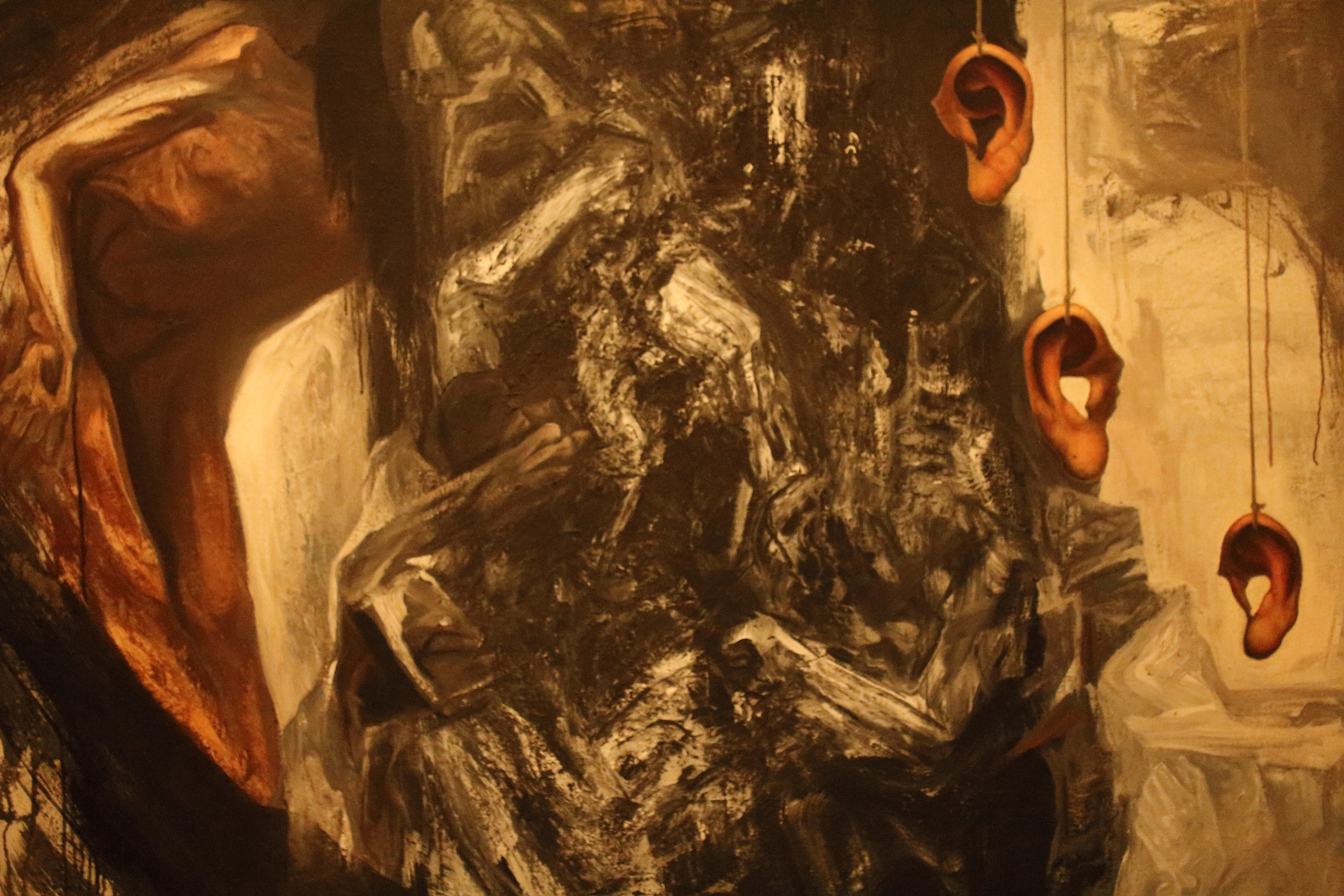
Art by Nishizawa

Nishizawa was a painter, engraver, graphic artist, sketch artist and ceramicist. His techniques included drawing, watercolor and ink. Most of his works depict landscapes of the central highlands of Mexico such as the Valley of Mexico, areas in Morelos, Guanajuato, Puebla and the State of Mexico. He is considered to have been one of Mexico's best landscape artists, known for his paintings of volcanoes. Some of his more important canvases include Paisaje: Valle de México (1947), Paisaje de Yagul (1976) and Pátzcuaro (1960) where the blending of this Mexican and Japanese heritage and training are evident. His works have been exhibited in the Museo de Arte Moderno for over forty years, but most of his works can be found in the permanent collection of the Museo Taller Nishizawa. He created murals, paintings, drawings, ceramic and glass pieces and sculpture. His works can be found in the permanent collections of the Centro Cultural Mexiquense in Toluca, the Museo de Bellas Artes in Toluca, the Instituto Nacional de Bellas Artes y Literatura, the Museo de la Estampa and the Museo Carrillo Gil, the Engraving Museum in Bulgaria, the Culture Museum in Yokohama, the Museum of Modern Art in Kyoto and the Shinanu Museum in Nagano. His works are also held in private collections in Mexico, Japan and the United States.

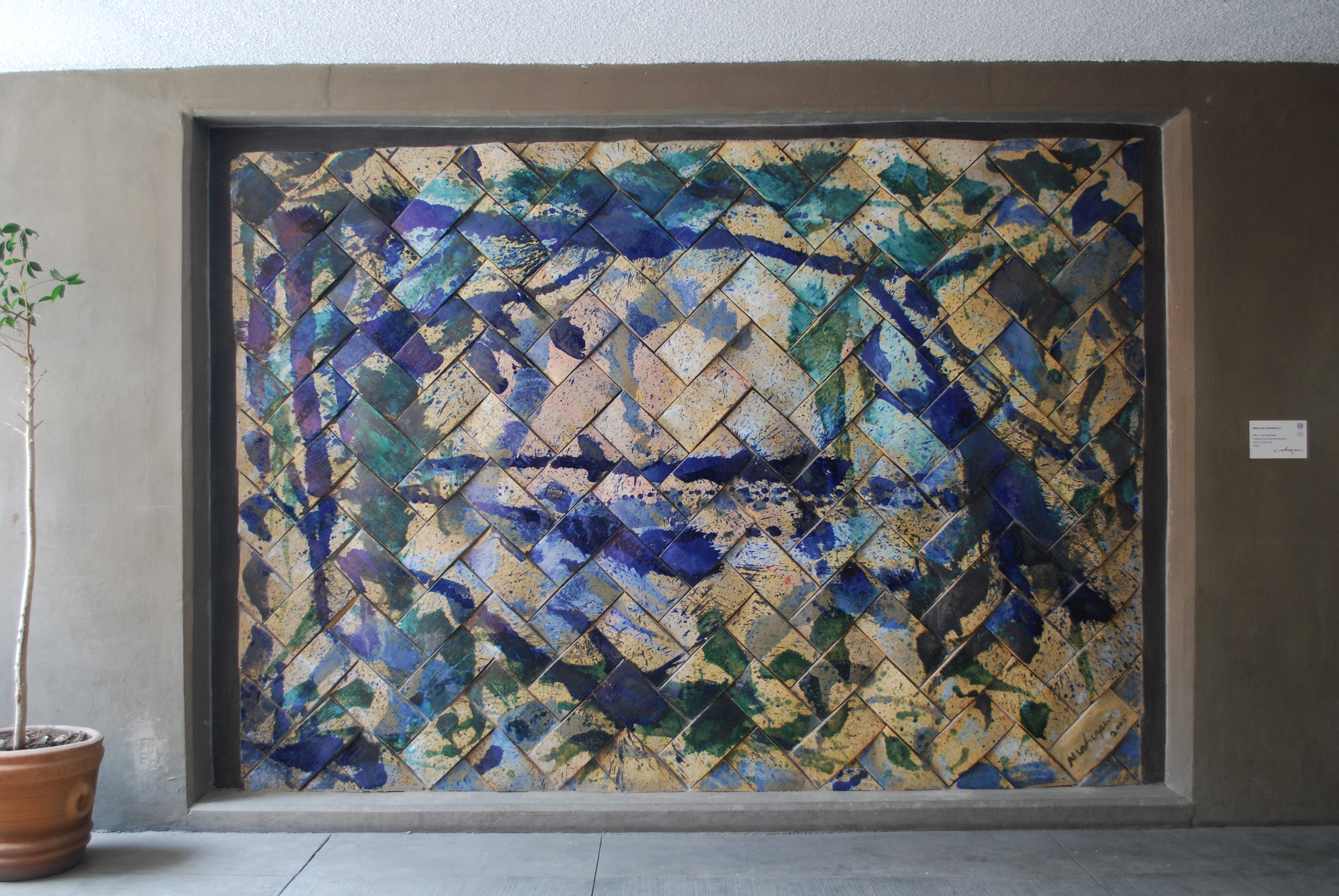
Mural en Cerámica II at the Escuela Nacional de Artes Plásticas.

He participated in numerous individual and collective exhibitions in Mexico and abroad, with his first individual exhibition in 1951. Individual exhibitions include Pago en especie in Cancún (a collection of paintings donated to the Secretaría de Hacienda y Crédito Público), Retrospective in the Gallery of the University of Colima, and De Ayer y Hoy at the Teléfonos de México, The work of Nishizawa at the Ruth Hermose Galleries in San Francisco as well as various exhibitions at the Salón de la Plástica Mexicana and the Instituto Nacional de Bellas Artes, and “Las vacas flacas y los sueños rotos” in various locations and times. In 1995, the Casa de Cultura in Cancún held an exhibition to honor his life's work. The Instituto Nacional de Bellas Artes y Literature sponsored an exhibition of his life's work at the Museo Nacional de San Carlos in 2008.

Nishizawa painted his first major mural “El aire es vida y la salud es la mayor riqueza” at the Centro Médico Nacional Siglo XXI, with another shortly after in 1969 at the Hospital General de Zona No. 4 in Celaya, Guanajuato with the name of “El Nacimiento de la Vida” done with high fire ceramics. One of his important works is a ceramic mural done in a Keisei metro station in Japan in 1981. Other murals are found at the Centro Cultural Martí, the Centro Cultural Universitario, the General Archives of the State of Mexico in Toluca, the Procuraduría General de la República and the Secretaría de Educación Pública . One of his most recent murals is “La Justicia,” which was created in the main stairwell of the Mexican Supreme Court for the Bicentennial of Mexico's Independence in 2010.

== Artistry ==
Over his career, Nishizawa employed various techniques and styles in his work, with some of his best known work being in ink. He is one of few painters who also draws as an end rather than just a means. Most of his work is dedicated to nature, the universe and the human figure, with much of the imagery influenced by his childhood contact with the landscape of Mexico. His Japanese and Mexican ethnic heritage is evident in his work, with themes mostly related to Mexico but Japanese style and technique evident, especially with the use of color.

== Recognition ==
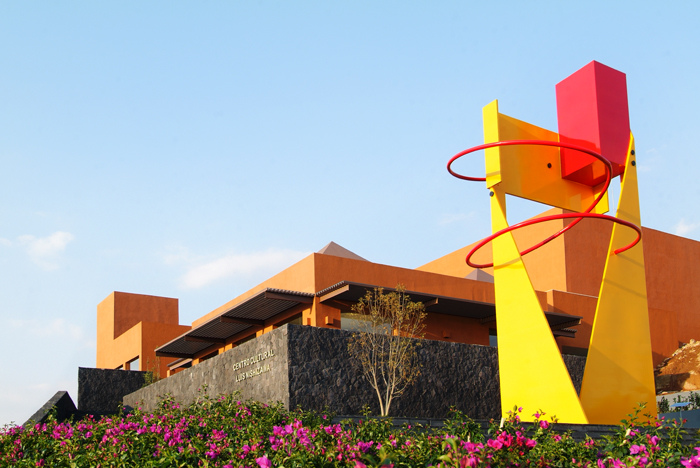
The Centro Cultural Luis Nishizawa in Atizapán de Zaragoza, Edomex.

Nishizawa received recognition from the Universidad Nacional Autónoma de México, as a judge for the Premio Universidad Nacional, receiving an honorary doctorate from the school in 1996 and named Master Emeritus (Maestro Emérito) as well. Related to the Mexican government, he was named Creator Emeritus by CONACULTA, received the Premio Nacional de Artes in 1996, and was commemorated with a Mexican postage stamp. He was honored various times by the State of Mexico, which created the Museo Taller Luis Nishizawa in an old mansion near the Palacio de Gobierno in Toluca.

Other honors include membership in the Academy of Arts of Mexico, various institutions named after him such as the Galería Luis Nishizawa at UNAM and the Centro Cultural Luis Nishizawa at the Campus Estado de México of ITESM, and received the Sacred Treasure of the Dragon award from the government of Japan.

== Museo Taller Luis Nishizawa ==
The Museo Taller Luis Nishizawa was inaugurated in 1992 in a mansion from the end of the 18th century in Toluca, restored for its current purpose. It was created in recognition for his creative work as well as his work as an art professor. The institution functions as both a museum and workshop as well as center of documentation on the artist for researchers and the general public. Its main function is to preserve and promote the works of the artist and contains about 800 works in various media. It has seven halls for temporary exhibits, a library and spaces for concerts, conferences and workshop in ceramics, engraving and drawing.
