= Antonio Rodríguez Luna =

Spanish painter

Antonio Rodríguez Luna (July 22, 1910 – 1985) was a Spanish painter who developed most of his career while in exile in Mexico during the Spanish Civil War. He began his career young, while still studying in Madrid and before the war had already exhibited in various places in Europe. His opposition to Francisco Franco, forced him into exile, with intellectuals and artists in the country arranging his asylum. His career here included a Guggenheim Fellowship with major exhibitions in Washington DC and New York along with exhibitions at the Museo de Arte Moderno and the Palacio de Bellas Artes in Mexico. Despite his success, he never forgot his Spanish roots, with an exhibition in Madrid in 1971 and a return to his hometown of Montoro in 1981, after the death of Franco.

== Life ==
Rodríguez Luna was born in the town of Montoro in the Córdoba province of Spain. He began his art studies when he was thirteen, first at the Escuela de Bellas Artes in Seville. In 1927, he moved to Madrid to study at the Escuela de Bellas Artes there, meeting José Planes, Enrique Climent, Arturo Souto and Francisco Mateos, with whom he formed the Artistas Independientes group.

With the rise of Franco, he fled Spain, winding up in concentration camps in Argelès-sur-Mer and Brand, experiences represented in the later published Diez aguafuertes. Lázaro Cárdenas and a list of artists and intellectuals worked to bring him as an exile to Mexico City in 1939.

Rodríguez Luna lived in Mexico for forty six years. Although he developed his career in Mexico, he never forgot his Spanish roots. In the 1960s, Spanish cinematographers petitioned to let him back in the country to see his aging parents, but by the time he could do so, his father had died and his mother did not recognize him. He returned again in 1975 to exhibit at the Juana Mordó Gallery.

In 1981, after the death of Franco, Rodríguez Luna was able to return permanently to Spain, settling back in his hometown of Montoro, where he donated paintings to start a museum in his name. He continued to paint until his death in the town in 1985.

== Career ==
A prodigy, Rodríguez Luna began his career at a young age, while still studying art in Madrid. In 1929, he was one of the founders of the Salón de los Indepedientes. This was followed by his first individual exhibition at the Salón de Herado in Madrid and anthor at the Ateneo in the same city. He also won first prize at the National Painting and Drawing Competition in Madrid. From then he had exhibitions at the Madrid Fall Salon, an exhibition of Spanish Artists in San Sebastián, the Exposition of Catalan Art in Barcelona and the Maison de la Culture in Paris and the Paris Exposition. During the Spanish Civil War, while the Republican government was still in control, he was sent to the Venice Biennale to exhibit a series on the war called Veinte dibujos sobre la Guerra.

The artist continued his career in Mexico after exile, developing most of it in this country. Soon after arrival, he helped to found the Editorial Séneca publishers. He had his first art exhibition in Mexico at the Galería de Arte Mexicano in 1941, which became the only private gallery he exhibited in during his career, although he did have exhibits in museums. That same year, Rodríguez Luna received a Guggenheim Fellowship, which led to a major exhibitions in Washington and in New York. In the 1940s and 1950s he was very active as a painter as well as a teacher at the Escuela Nacional de Artes Plásticas. In the 1960s and 1970s he had shows in San Francisco, San Diego, the Museo de Arte Moderno, the Galería de Arte Mexicano and the Juan Mordó Gallery in Madrid.

His works can be found in public and private collections in various parts of the world, especially in Mexico and the United States. These include those of the Museum of Modern Art in Madrid (the youngest painter to have works included in this collection), the Barcelona City Council and the Ministry of Education in Spain. Works have also been published in two books, 10 Aguafuertes in 1940 and Danzas de los Concheros de San Miguel de Allende in 1941.

Rodríguez Luna was accepted as a member of Mexico’s Salón de la Plástica Mexicana. The Museo de Arte Moderno held the first retrospective of his work in 1959, when the institution was still at the Palacio de Bellas Artes and held another in 1980. In 1984, the Palacio itself held a retrospective. In 1985, shortly before his death, his hometown in Spain opened a museum named after him in the former chapel of San Jacinto. Since then, there have been two major exhibitions and tributes to the artists, one in 1997 at the Franz Mayer Museum and another in 2008 at the Museo-Taller Nishizawa.

== Artistry ==
Rodríguez Luna is one of the most important painters from Córdoba in the 20th century. Luis Cardoza y Aragón stated that the “… carries the model inside himself and he transcends it sin such a way that it takes form as a fiction which is more real than reality itself.” He was one of the first artists in Spain to embrace the European trends of the 1920s, with his early work influenced by Surrealism and Expressionism. During his career, his work would evolve from this to forms of abstractionism in his later career with phases in social realism and neo-Cubism. Social realism was most prominent during the Spanish Civil War and early exile in Mexico. In Spain still, he used it to denounce what was happening in the country. After arriving to Mexico, he first worked on themes consistent with the then-dominant Mexican muralism movement, but soon returned to themes from before the war.

Works from the height of his career in the 1940s and 1950s show a lyrical sense, with colors such as grays, blacks, blues and whites dominant. Dark areas predominate and stand out, with areas of nothing but a single color. The artist himself stated that “To paint is to search for the depth and density of emotion which and object may have.”
