= Diego Rivera =

Mexican muralist (1886–1957)

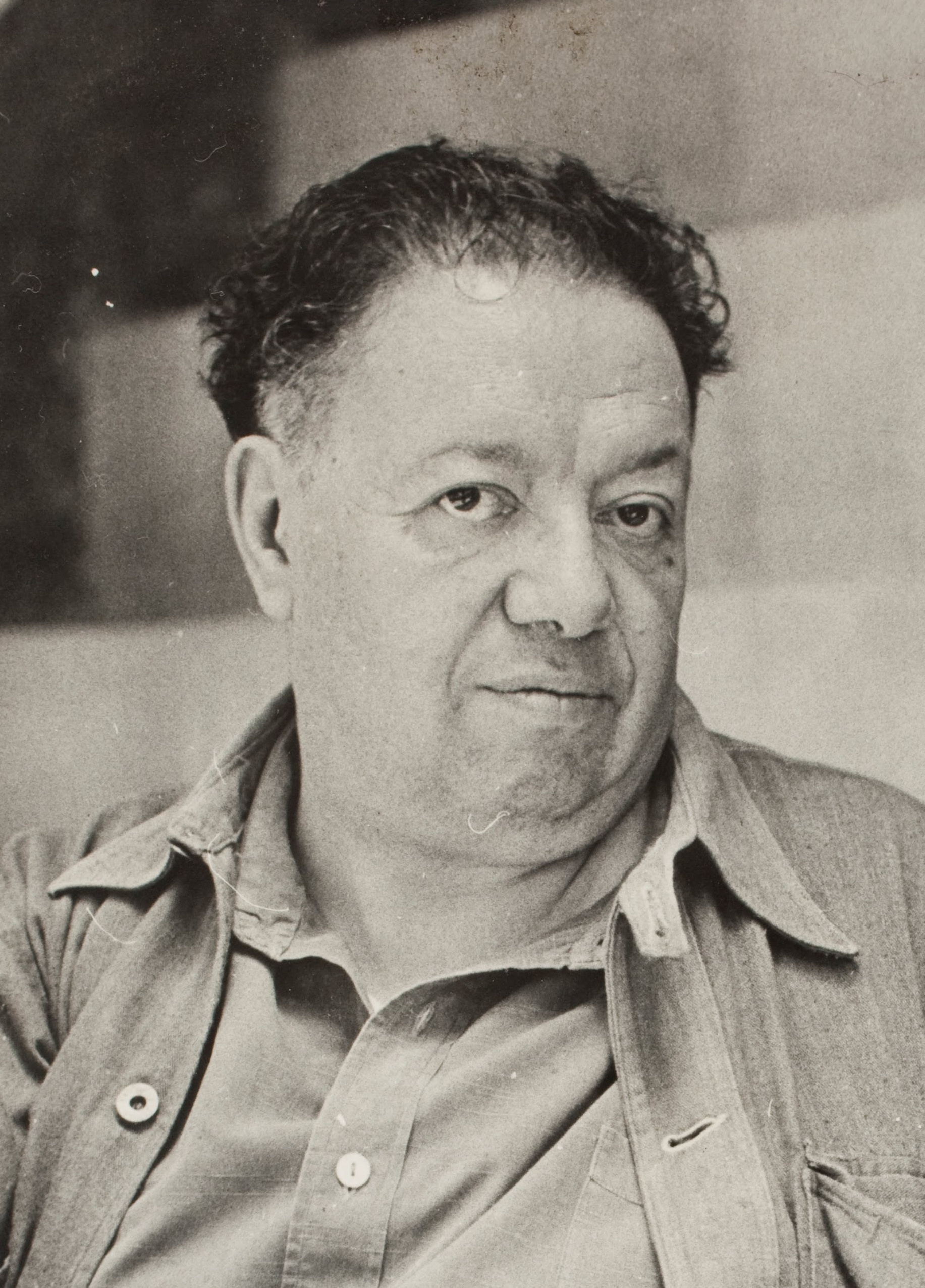
- Rivera in 1957
- Born: Diego María de la Concepción Juan Nepomuceno Estanislao de la Rivera y Barrientos Acosta y Rodríguez; December 8, 1886; Guanajuato City, Guanajuato, Mexico
- Died: November 24, 1957 (aged 70); Mexico City, Mexico
- Resting place: Panteón de Dolores, Mexico City
- Education: Academy of San Carlos
- Known for: Painting, murals
- Notable work: Man, Controller of the Universe, The History of Mexico, Detroit Industry Murals, Man at the Crossroads
- Movement: Cubism; Realism; Mexican muralism
- Spouses: Angelina Beloff (m. 1911; div. 1921) Guadalupe Marín (m. 1922; div. 1928) Frida Kahlo (m. 1929; div. 1939) (m. 1940; died 1954) Emma Hurtado Olin (m. 1955)
- Relatives: Marika Rivera (daughter); Ruth Rivera Marín (daughter)

Diego María de la Concepción Juan Nepomuceno Estanislao de la Rivera y Barrientos Acosta y Rodríguez (Note: In this name that follows Hispanic American naming customs, the first or paternal surname is Rivera y Barrientos and the second or maternal family name is Acosta y Rodríguez.) (Spanish pronunciation: [ˈdjeɣo riˈβeɾa]; December 8, 1886 – November 24, 1957) was a Mexican painter. His large frescoes helped establish the mural movement in Mexican and international art.

Between 1922 and 1953, Rivera painted murals in, among other places, Mexico City, Chapingo, and Cuernavaca in Mexico, and San Francisco, Detroit, and New York City in the United States. In 1931, a retrospective exhibition of his works was held at the Museum of Modern Art in Manhattan, shortly before Rivera's commencement of his 27-mural series known as Detroit Industry Murals the next year.

Rivera had four wives and numerous children, including at least one illegitimate daughter. His first child and only son died at the age of two. His third wife was fellow Mexican artist Frida Kahlo, with whom he had a volatile relationship that continued until her death. His previous two marriages, ending in divorce, were respectively to a fellow artist and a novelist, and his final marriage was to his agent.

Due to his importance in the country's art history, the government of Mexico declared Rivera's works as monumentos históricos. Rivera held the record for highest price at auction for a work by a Latin American artist until November 2021, with his 1931 painting The Rivals. The painting was part of the record-setting collection of Peggy Rockefeller and David Rockefeller, and sold for $9.76 million USD at a 2018 Christie's auction.

== Personal life ==
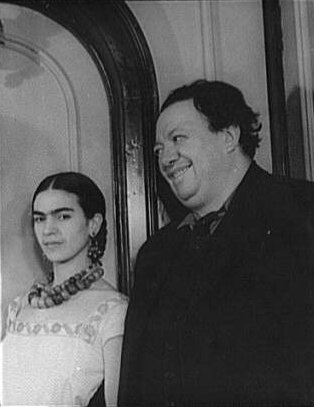
Frida Kahlo and Diego Rivera in 1932, photo by: Carl Van Vechten

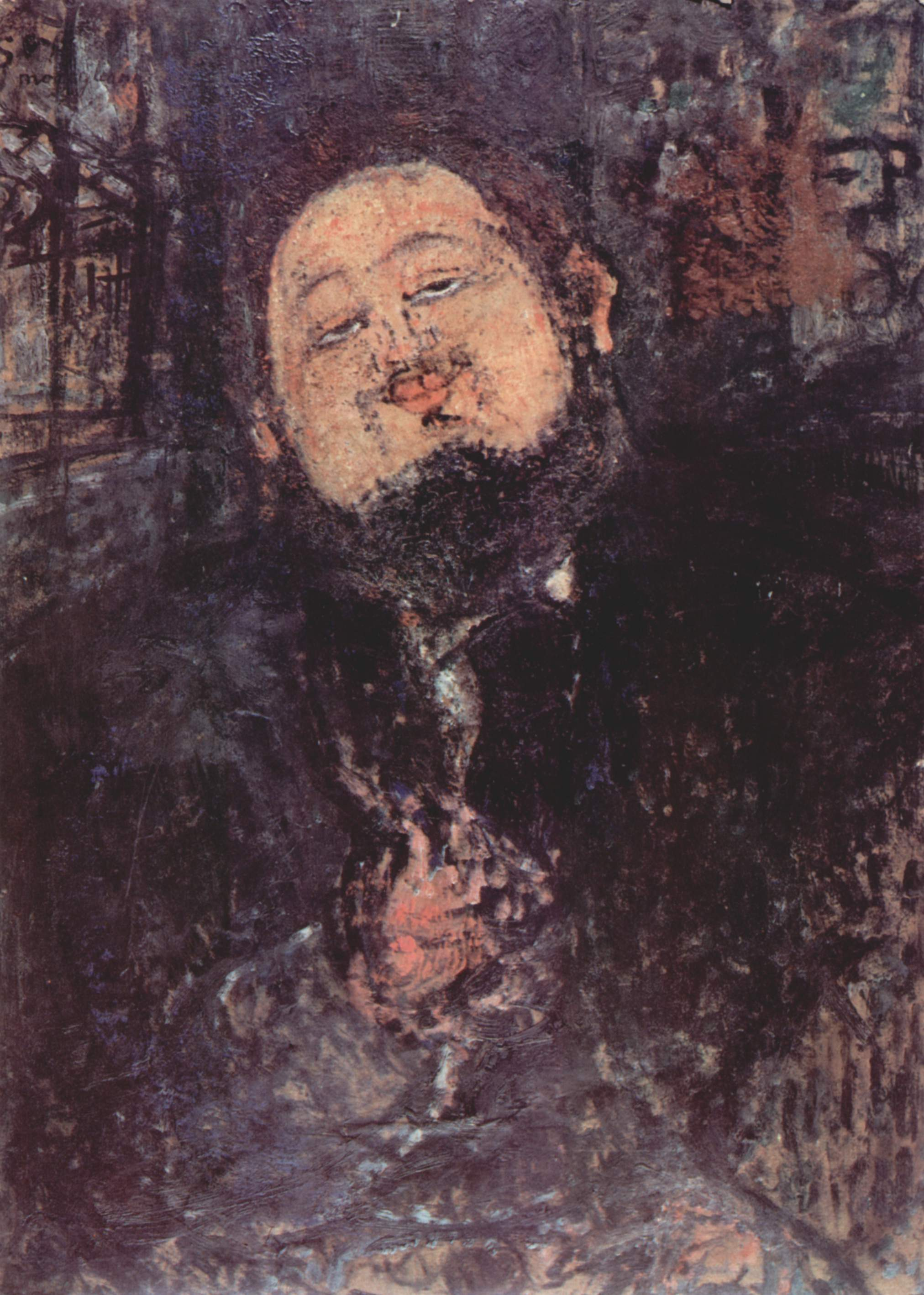
Amedeo Modigliani, Portrait of Diego Rivera, 1914

Rivera was born on December 8, 1886, in Guanajuato, Mexico, to María del Pilar Barrientos and Diego Rivera Acosta, a well-to-do couple. His twin brother Carlos died at the age of two.

His mother María del Pilar Barrientos was said to have converso ancestry (Spanish ancestors who were forced to convert from Judaism to Catholicism in the 15th and 16th centuries). Rivera wrote in 1935: "My Jewishness is the dominant element in my life", despite never being raised practicing any Jewish faith, Rivera felt that his Jewish ancestry informed his art and gave him "sympathy with the downtrodden masses". Diego was of Spanish, Amerindian, African, Italian, Jewish, Russian, and Portuguese descent.

Rivera began drawing at the age of three, a year after his twin brother died. When he was caught drawing on the walls of the house, his parents installed chalkboards and canvas on the walls to encourage him.

=== Marriages and family ===
After moving to Paris, Rivera met Angelina Beloff, an artist from the pre-Revolutionary Russian Empire. They married in 1911, and had a son, Diego (1916–1918), who died young. During that time, Rivera also had a relationship with painter Maria Vorobieff-Stebelska, who gave birth to a daughter named Marika Rivera in 1918 or 1919.

Portrait of Angelina Beloff, 1918

Rivera divorced Beloff and married Guadalupe Marín as his second wife in June 1922, after having returned to Mexico. They had two daughters, Ruth and Guadalupe.

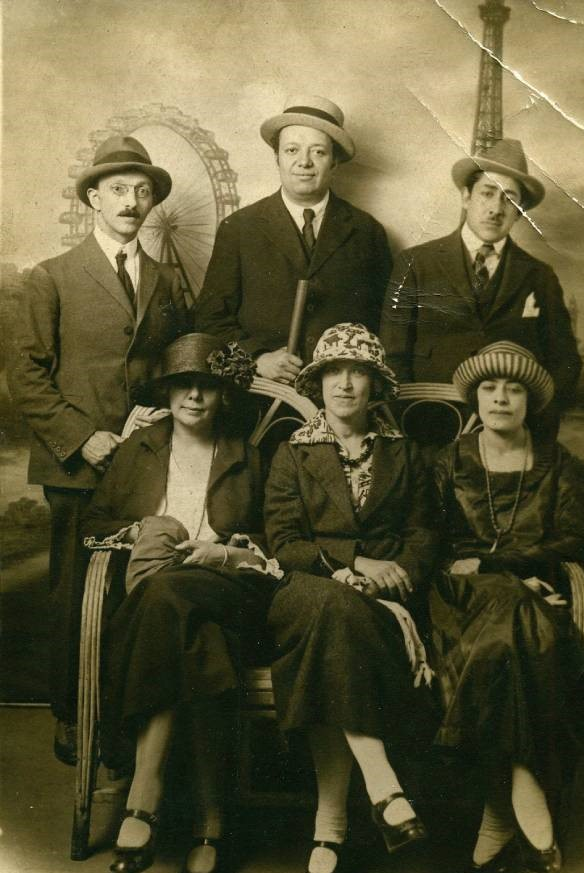
From left to right, top to bottom, Leon Caillou, Rivera, David Alfaro Siqueiros, Magda Caillou, Angelina Beloff, Graciela Amador in Paris, 1920

He was still married when he met art student Frida Kahlo in Mexico City. They began a passionate affair and, after he divorced Marín, Rivera married Kahlo on August 21, 1929. He was 42 and she was 22. Their mutual infidelities and his violent temper resulted in divorce in 1939, but they remarried December 8, 1940, in San Francisco. A year after Kahlo's death, on July 29, 1955, Rivera married Emma Hurtado Olin, his agent since 1946. In his later years Rivera lived in the United States and Mexico. Rivera died on November 24, 1957, at the age of 70. He was buried at the Panteón de Dolores in Mexico City.

=== Personal beliefs ===
Rivera was an atheist. His mural Dreams of a Sunday in the Alameda depicted Ignacio Ramírez "El Nigromante" holding a sign that read, "God does not exist". This work caused a furor, but Rivera refused to remove the inscription. The painting was not shown for nine years – until Rivera agreed to remove the inscription. He said, "To affirm 'God does not exist', I do not have to hide behind Don Ignacio Ramírez; I am an atheist and I consider religions to be a form of collective neurosis."

=== Art education and circle ===
From the age of ten, Rivera studied art at the Academy of San Carlos in Mexico City. He was sponsored to continue study in Europe by Teodoro A. Dehesa Méndez, the governor of the state of Veracruz. After arriving in Europe in 1907, Rivera first went to Madrid to study with Eduardo Chicharro. From there he went to Paris, a destination for young European and American artists and writers, who settled in inexpensive flats in Montparnasse. His circle frequented La Ruche, where his Italian friend Amedeo Modigliani painted his portrait in 1914. His circle of close friends included Ilya Ehrenburg, Chaïm Soutine, Modigliani and his wife Jeanne Hébuterne, Max Jacob, gallery owner Léopold Zborowski, and Moise Kisling. Rivera's former lover Marie Vorobieff-Stebelska (Marevna) honored the circle in her painting Homage to Friends from Montparnasse (1962).

In those years, some prominent young painters were experimenting with an art form that would later be known as Cubism, a movement led by Pablo Picasso and Georges Braque. From 1913 to 1917, Rivera enthusiastically embraced this new style. Around 1917, inspired by Paul Cézanne's paintings, Rivera shifted toward Post-Impressionism, using simple forms and large patches of vivid colors. His paintings began to attract attention, and he was able to display them at several exhibitions.

Rivera claimed in his autobiography that, while in Mexico in 1904, he engaged in cannibalism, pooling his money with others to "purchase cadavers from the city morgue" and particularly "relish[ing] women's brains in vinaigrette". This claim has been considered factually suspect or an elaborate lie. He wrote in his autobiography: "I believe that when man evolves a civilization higher than the mechanized but still primitive one he has now, the eating of human flesh will be sanctioned. For then man will have thrown off all of his superstitions and irrational taboos."

== Career in Mexico ==
In 1920, urged by Alberto J. Pani, the Mexican ambassador to France, Rivera left France and traveled through Italy studying its art, including Renaissance frescoes. After José Vasconcelos became Minister of Education, Rivera returned to Mexico in 1921 to become involved in the government sponsored Mexican mural program planned by Vasconcelos. The program included such Mexican artists as José Clemente Orozco, David Alfaro Siqueiros, and Rufino Tamayo, and the French artist Jean Charlot. In January 1922, he painted–experimentally in encaustic–his first significant mural Creation in the Bolívar Auditorium of the National Preparatory School in Mexico City while guarding himself with a pistol against right-wing students.

Bodegón español, 1918

In the autumn of 1922, Rivera participated in the founding of the Revolutionary Union of Technical Workers, Painters and Sculptors, and later that year he joined the Mexican Communist Party (including its Central Committee). His murals, subsequently painted only in fresco, are about Mexican society and reflected the country's 1910 Revolution. Rivera developed his own native style based on large, simplified figures and bold colors with an Aztec influence clearly present in murals at the Secretariat of Public Education in Mexico City begun in September 1922, intended to consist of 124 frescoes, and finished in 1928. Rivera's art work, in a fashion similar to the steles of the Maya, tells stories. The mural En el Arsenal (In the Arsenal) shows on the right-hand side Tina Modotti holding an ammunition belt and facing Julio Antonio Mella, in a light hat, and Vittorio Vidali behind in a black hat. However, the En el Arsenal detail shown does not include the right-hand side described nor any of the three individuals mentioned; instead it shows the left-hand side with Frida Kahlo handing out munitions. Leon Trotsky lived with Rivera and Kahlo for several months while exiled in Mexico. Some of Rivera's most famous murals are featured at the National School of Agriculture (Chapingo Autonomous University of Agriculture) at Chapingo near Texcoco (1925–1927), in the Cortés Palace in Cuernavaca (1929–30), and the National Palace in Mexico City (1929–30, 1935).

Rivera painted murals in the main hall and corridor at the Chapingo Autonomous University of Agriculture (UACh). He also painted a fresco mural titled Tierra Fecundada (Fertile Land in English) in the university's chapel between 1923 and 1927. Fertile Land depicts the revolutionary struggles of Mexico's peasant (farmers) and working classes (industry) in part through the depiction of hammer and sickle joined by a star in the soffit of the chapel. In the mural, a "propagandist" points to another hammer and sickle. The mural features a woman with an ear of corn in each hand, which art critic Antonio Rodriguez describes as evocative of the Aztec goddess of maize in his book Canto a la Tierra: Los murales de Diego Rivera en la Capilla de Chapingo.

The corpses of revolutionary heroes Emiliano Zapata and Otilio Montaño are shown in graves, their bodies fertilizing the maize field above. A sunflower in the center of the scene "glorifies those who died for an ideal and are reborn, transfigured, into the fertile cornfield of the nation", writes Rodrigues. The mural also depicts Rivera's wife Guadalupe Marin as a fertile nude goddess and their daughter Guadalupe Rivera y Marín as a cherub. The mural was slightly damaged in an earthquake, but has since been repaired and touched up, remaining in pristine form.

== Later years ==
En el Arsenal (detail), 1928

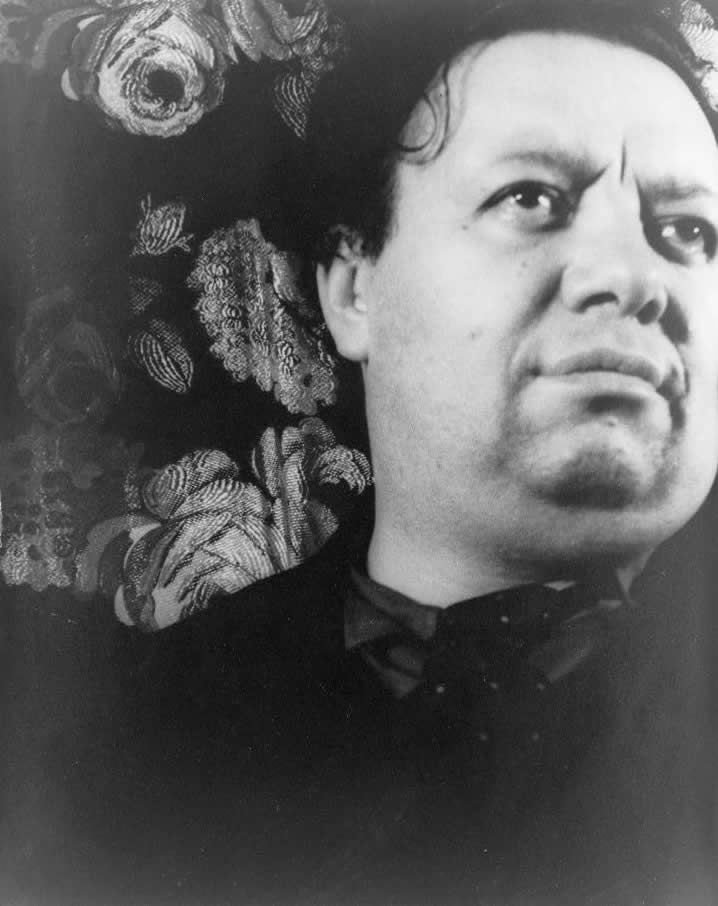
Portrait of Diego Rivera, March 19, 1932; photo by Carl Van Vechten

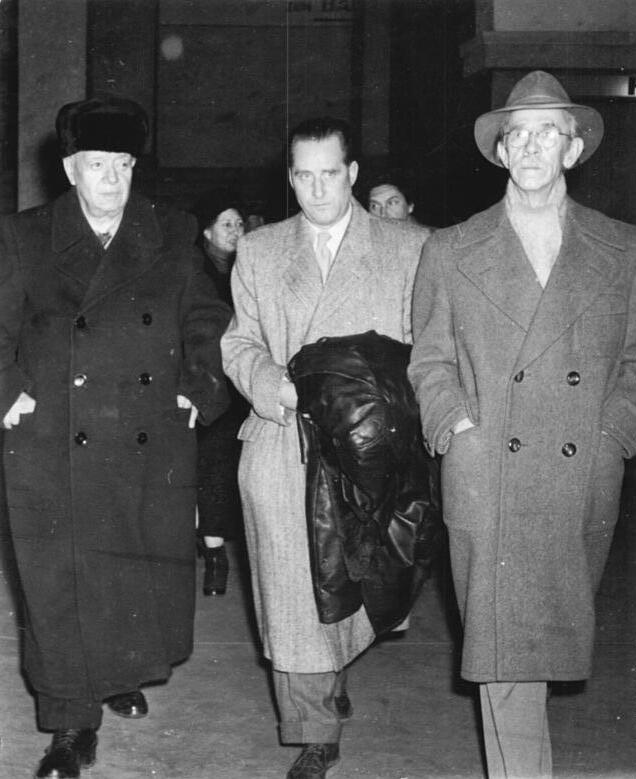
Rivera (left) accompanies the director Rudolf Engel (center) and vice-president Otto Nagel (right) of the Akademie der Künste der DDR; Berlin Ostbahnhof, March 21, 1956.

In the autumn of 1927, Rivera went to Moscow, Soviet Union, having accepted a government invitation to take part in the celebration of the 10th anniversary of the October Revolution. The following year, while still in the Soviet Union, he met American Alfred H. Barr Jr., who would soon become Rivera's friend and patron. Barr was the founding director of the Museum of Modern Art in New York City.

Although commissioned to paint a mural for the Red Army Club in Moscow, in 1928 Rivera was ordered by authorities to leave the country because, he suspected, of "resentment on the part of certain Soviet artists". He returned to Mexico. In 1929, after the assassination of president-elect Álvaro Obregón the previous year, the government suppressed the Mexican Communist Party. That year Rivera was expelled from the party because of his suspected Trotskyite sympathies. In addition, observers noted that his 1928 mural In the Arsenal includes the figures of communists Tina Modotti, Cuban Julio Antonio Mella, and Italian Vittorio Vidali. After Mella was murdered in January 1929, allegedly by Stalinist assassin Vidali, Rivera was accused of having had advance knowledge of a planned attack.

After divorcing his second wife, Guadalupe (Lupe) Marín, Rivera married the much younger Frida Kahlo in August 1929. They had met when she was a student, and she was 22 years old when they married; Rivera was 42. Also in 1929, American journalist Ernestine Evans's book The Frescoes of Diego Rivera, was published in New York City; it was the first English-language book on the artist. In December, Rivera accepted a commission from the American ambassador to Mexico to paint murals in the Palace of Cortés in Cuernavaca, where the US had a consulate.

In September 1930, Rivera accepted a commission by architect Timothy L. Pflueger for two works related to his design projects in San Francisco. Rivera and Kahlo went to the city in November. Rivera painted a mural for the City Club of the San Francisco Stock Exchange for US$2,500. He also completed a fresco for the California School of Fine Art, a work that was later relocated to what is now the Diego Rivera Gallery at the San Francisco Art Institute. During that period, Rivera and Kahlo worked and lived at the studio of Ralph Stackpole, who had recommended Rivera to Pflueger. Rivera met Helen Wills, a notable American tennis player, who modeled for his City Club mural.

In November 1931, the Museum of Modern Art in New York City mounted a retrospective exhibition of Rivera's work; Kahlo attended with him. Between 1932 and 1933, Rivera completed a major commission: twenty-seven fresco panels, entitled Detroit Industry, on the walls of an inner court at the Detroit Institute of Arts. Part of the cost was paid by Edsel Ford, scion of the entrepreneur.

During the McCarthyism of the 1950s, a large sign was placed in the courtyard defending the artistic merit of the murals while attacking his politics as "detestable".

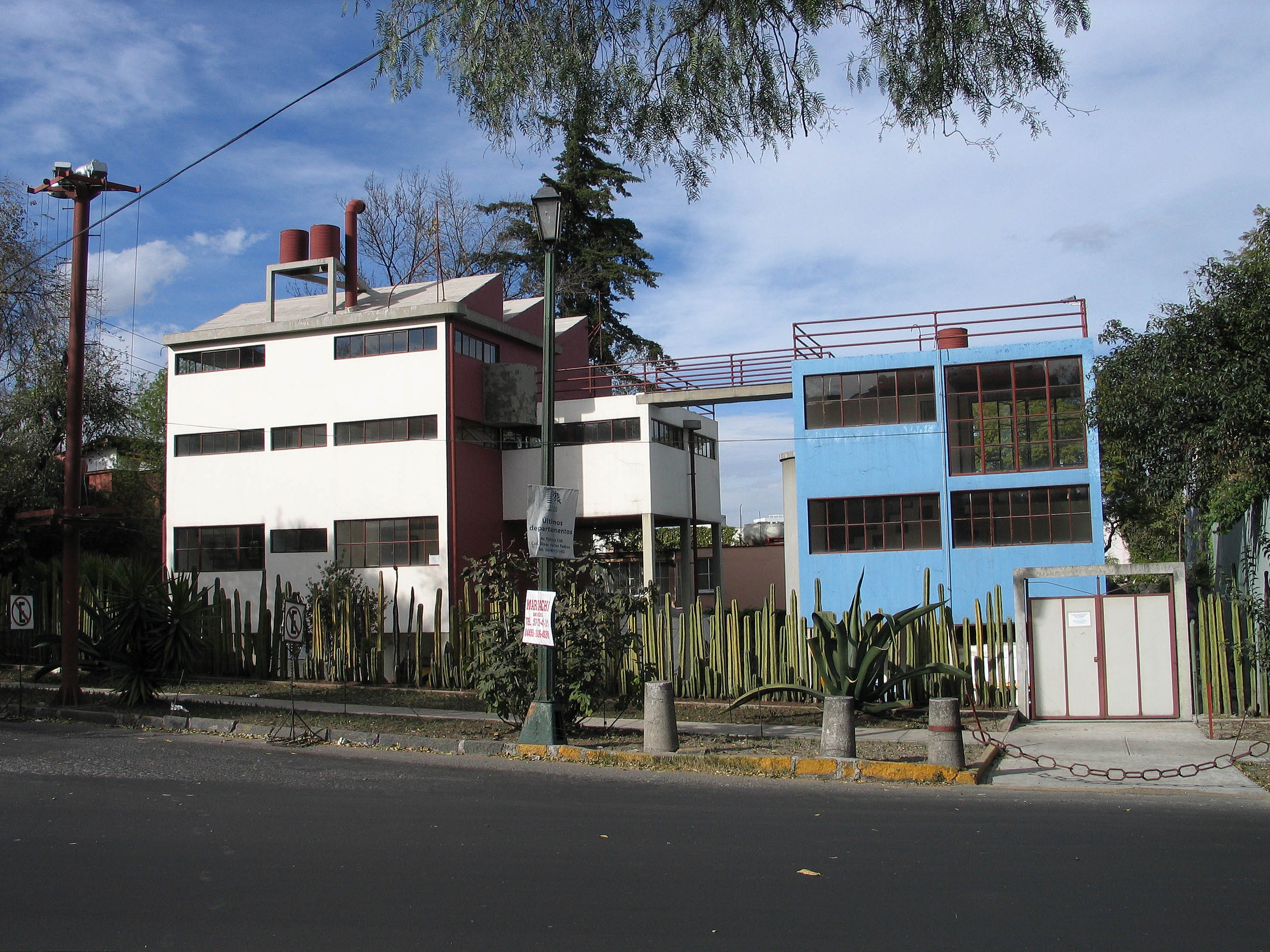
House of Diego Rivera and Frida Kahlo (built by Juan O'Gorman in 1930)

His mural Man at the Crossroads, originally a three-paneled work, begun as a commission for John D. Rockefeller Jr. in 1933 for the Rockefeller Center in New York City, was later destroyed. Because it included a portrait of Vladimir Lenin and Marxist pro-worker content, Rockefeller's son, the press, and some of the public protested, but the decision to destroy it was made by the management company. Anti-Communism ran high in some American circles, although many others in this period of the Great Depression had been drawn to the movement as offering hope to labor.

When Rivera refused to remove Lenin from the painting, he was ordered to leave the US. One of Rivera's assistants managed to take a few photographs of the work so Diego was able to later recreate it. American poet Archibald MacLeish wrote six "irony-laden" poems about the mural. The New Yorker magazine published E. B. White's light poem, "I paint what I see: A ballad of artistic integrity", also in response to the controversy with number of sponsors taking offense to it. As a result of the negative publicity, officials in Chicago cancelled their commission for Rivera to paint a mural for the Chicago World's Fair. Rivera released a press statement, saying that he would use the remaining money from his commission at Rockefeller Center to repaint the same mural, over and over, wherever he was asked, until the money ran out. He had been paid in full although the mural was reportedly destroyed. There have been rumors that the mural was covered over rather than removed and destroyed, but this has not been confirmed. In December 1933, Rivera returned to Mexico. He repainted Man at the Crossroads in 1934 in the Palacio de Bellas Artes in Mexico City, calling this version Man, Controller of the Universe.

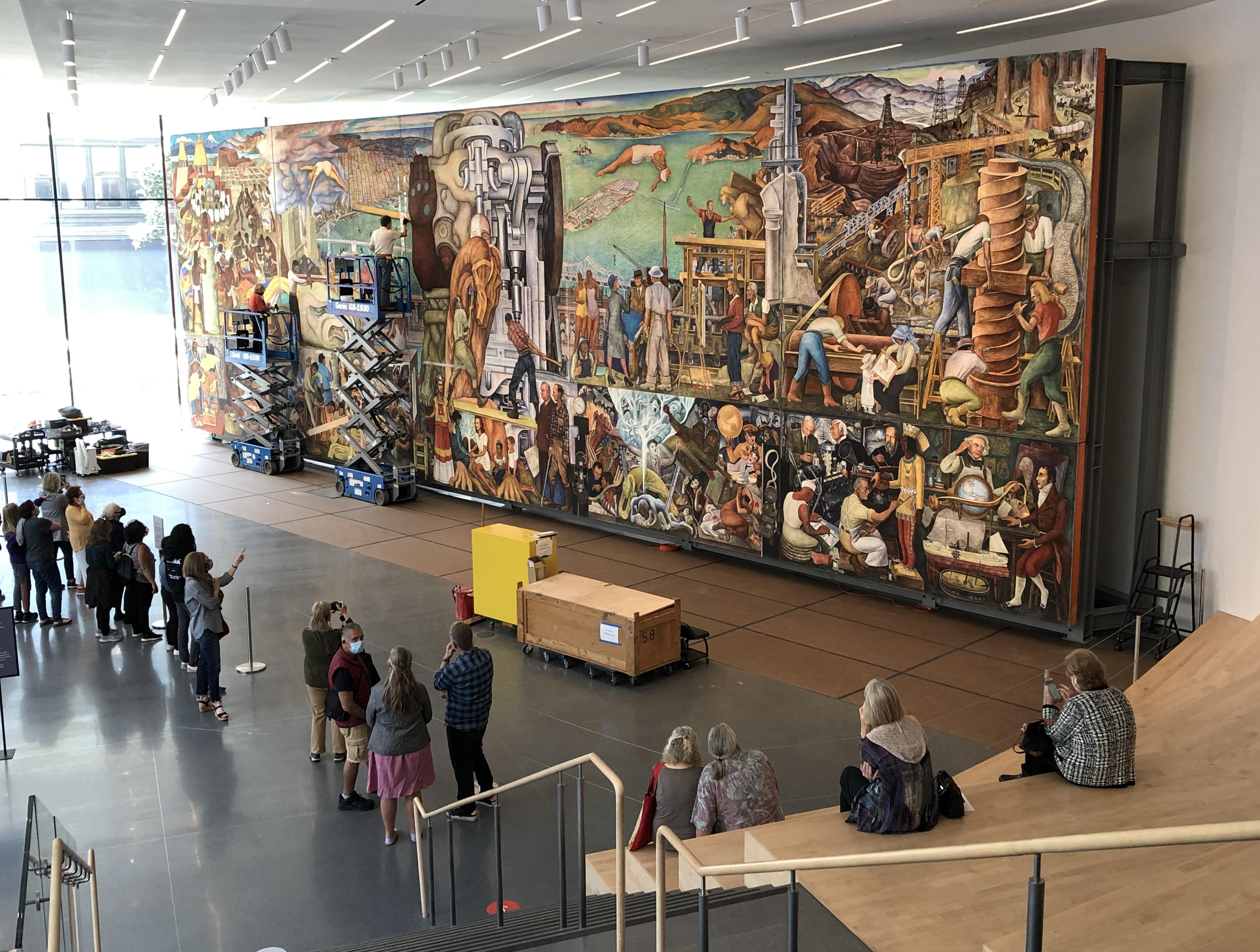
Diego Rivera's Pan American Unity mural (1940) under restoration in the Roberts Family Gallery at SFMOMA, July 19, 2021

On June 5, 1940, invited again by Pflueger, Rivera returned for the last time to the United States to paint a ten-panel mural for the Golden Gate International Exposition in San Francisco. His work, Pan American Unity, was completed on November 29, 1940. Rivera painted in front of attendees at the Exposition, which had already opened. He received US$1,000 per month and US$1,000 for travel expenses. The mural includes representations of two of Pflueger's architectural works, and portraits of Kahlo, woodcarver Dudley C. Carter, and actress Paulette Goddard. She is shown holding Rivera's hand as they plant a white tree together. Rivera's assistants on the mural included Thelma Johnson Streat, a pioneer African-American artist, dancer, and textile designer. The mural and its archives are now held by City College of San Francisco.

In 1946–47, Rivera painted A Dream of a Sunday Afternoon in the Alameda Park, a fresco that featured a fully elaborated figure of La Calavera Catrina. This character, which was created by José Guadalupe Posada, originally consisted of a print depicting the head and shoulders of a skeletal woman in a big hat. Rivera endowed his Catrina figure with indigenous features and thus transformed her into a nationalist icon. Catrina is the most common image associated with the Day of the Dead.

=== Membership in AMORC ===
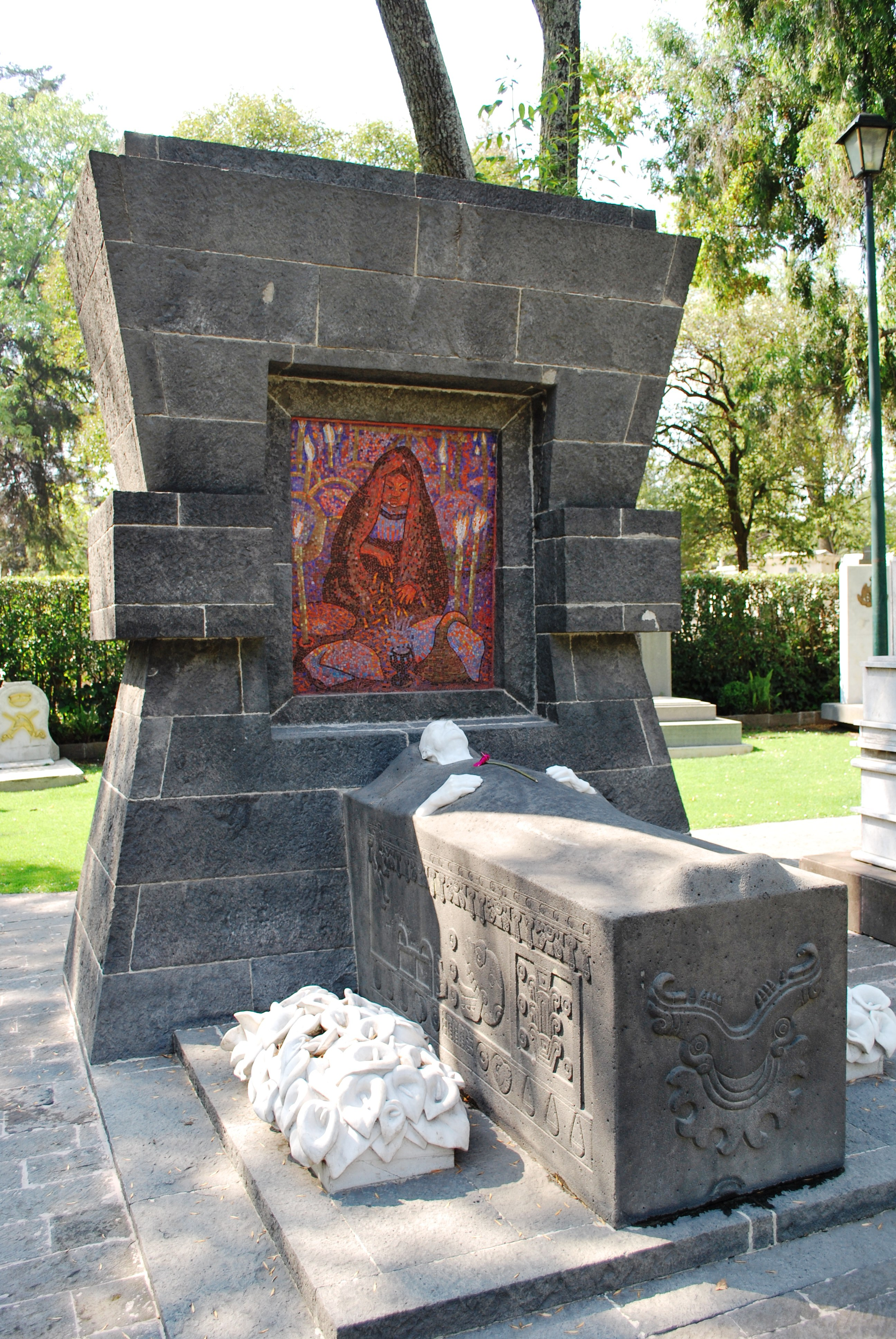
The Tomb of Diego Rivera in The Rotunda of Illustrious Persons inside the Panteón de Dolores

In 1926, Rivera became a member of AMORC, the Ancient Mystical Order Rosae Crucis, an occult organization founded by American occultist Harvey Spencer Lewis. In 1926, Rivera was among the founders of AMORC's Mexico City lodge, called Quetzalcoatl after the pre-Columbian deity. He painted an image of Quetzalcoatl for the local temple.

In 1954, Rivera tried to be readmitted into the Mexican Communist Party. He had been expelled in part because of his support of Trotsky, who had been exiled to Mexico and assassinated there in 1940. Rivera was required to justify his AMORC activities. At the time, the Mexican Communist Party excluded persons involved in Freemasonry, and regarded AMORC as suspiciously similar to Freemasonry. Rivera told his questioners that, by joining AMORC, he wanted to infiltrate a typical "Yankee" organization on behalf of Communism. However, he also claimed that AMORC was "essentially materialist, insofar as it only admits different states of energy and matter, and is based on ancient Egyptian occult knowledge from Amenhotep IV and Nefertiti".

=== Representation in other media ===
Diego Rivera has been portrayed in several films. He was played by Rubén Blades in Cradle Will Rock (1999), by Alfred Molina in Frida (2002), and (in a brief appearance) by José Montini in Eisenstein in Guanajuato (2015).

Barbara Kingsolver's novel, The Lacuna features Rivera, Kahlo, and Trotsky as major characters. An important scene of the Netflix television series Sense8 (season 1, episode 8: "Death Doesn't Let You Say Goodbye", broadcast in 2015) is played in the Anahuacalli Museum, called "Diego Rivera Museum" by the Lito character. He and his co-sensate, Nomi, discuss about Rivera sitting in front of what is supposed to be a sketch of Rivera's Man at the Crossroads mural for the Rockefeller Center, destroyed in 1933 by Rockefeller.

== Autobiography ==
My Life, My Art: An Autobiography, by Diego Rivera, with Gladys March, was published posthumously in 1960. Beginning with a 1944 interview for a newspaper article, March "spent several months each year with Rivera, eventually filling 2,000 pages with his recollections and interpretations of his art and life", and compiled an autobiography, written in the first person.

== Gallery ==
=== Paintings ===
Self-portrait with Broad-Brimmed Hat, 1907, 84.5 × 61.5 cm. Museo Dolores Olmedo

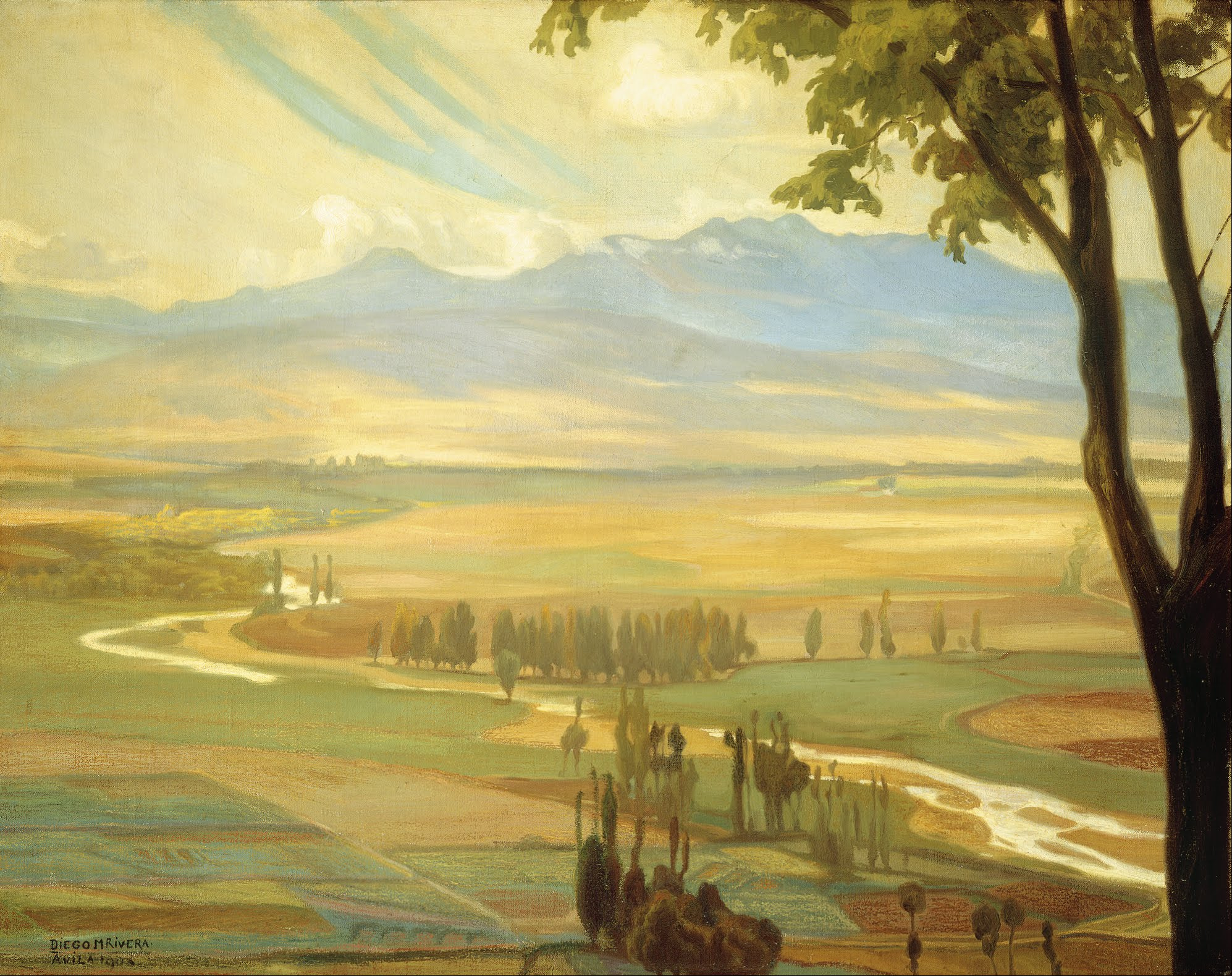
Avila Morning (The Ambles Valley), 1908, 97 × 123 cm. Museo Nacional de Arte

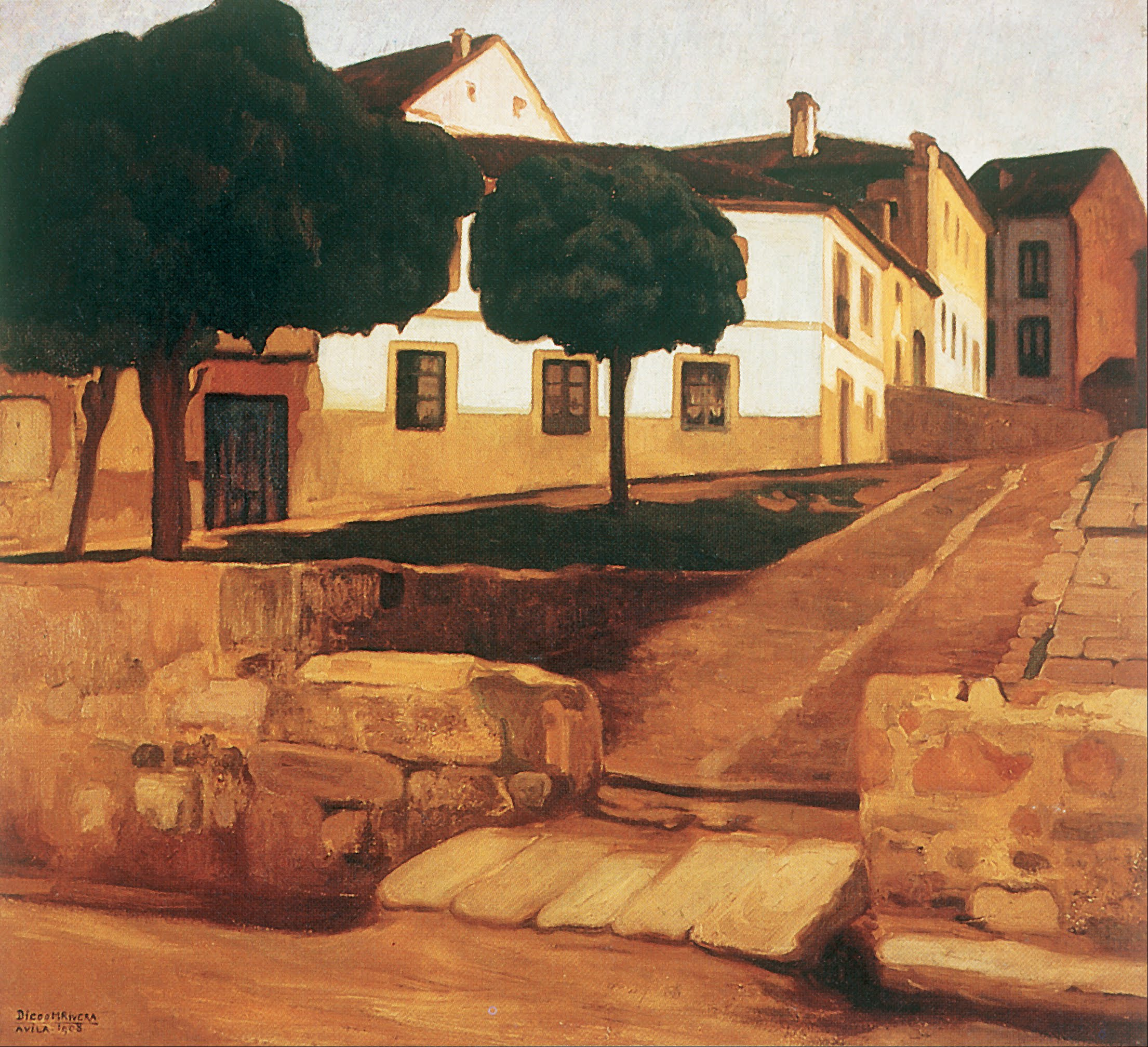
Street in Ávila (Ávila Landscape), 1908, 129 × 141 cm. Museo Nacional de Arte

El Picador, 1909, 177 × 113 cm. Museo Dolores Olmedo

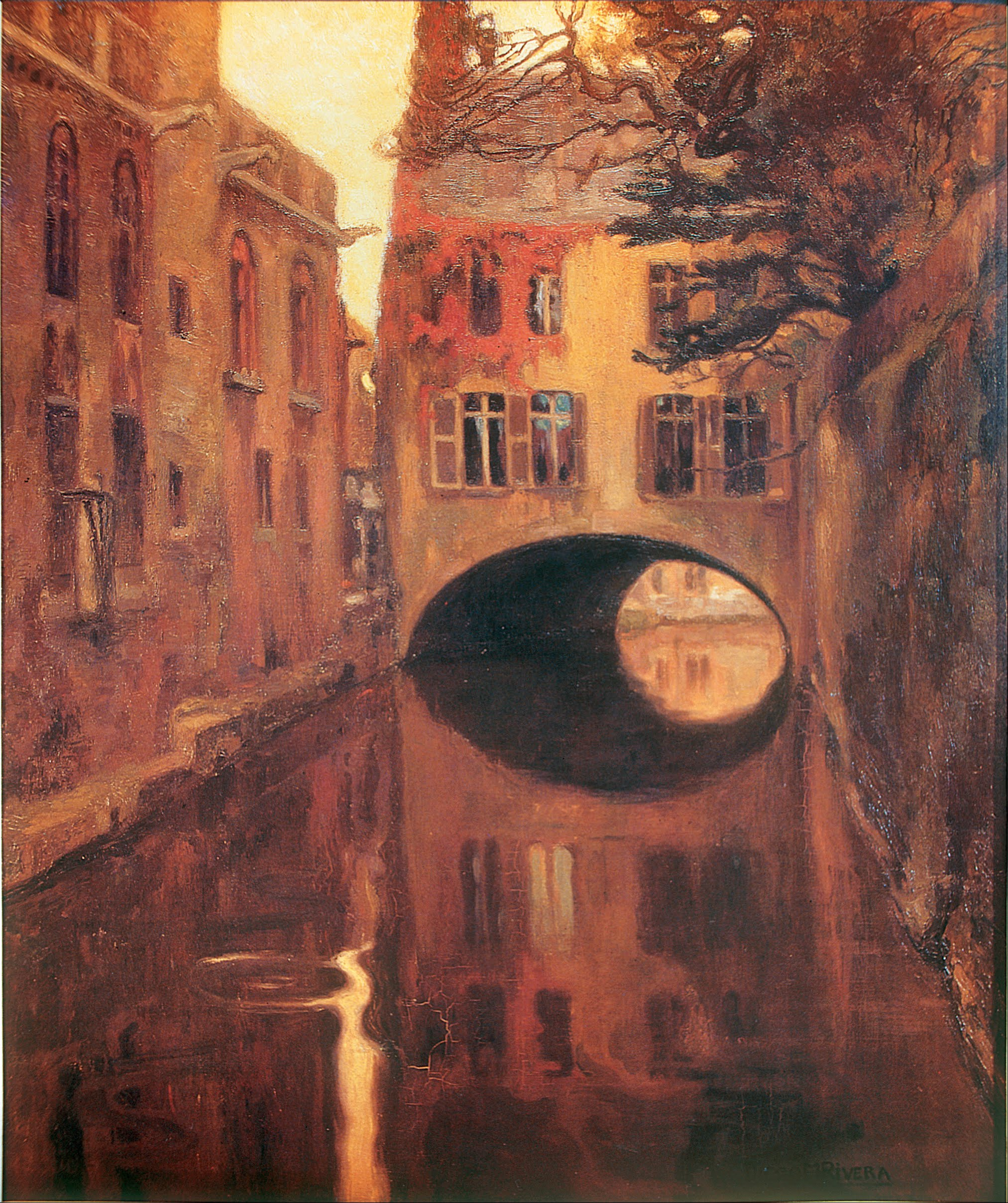
The House on the Bridge, 1909, 147 × 121 cm. Museo Nacional de Arte

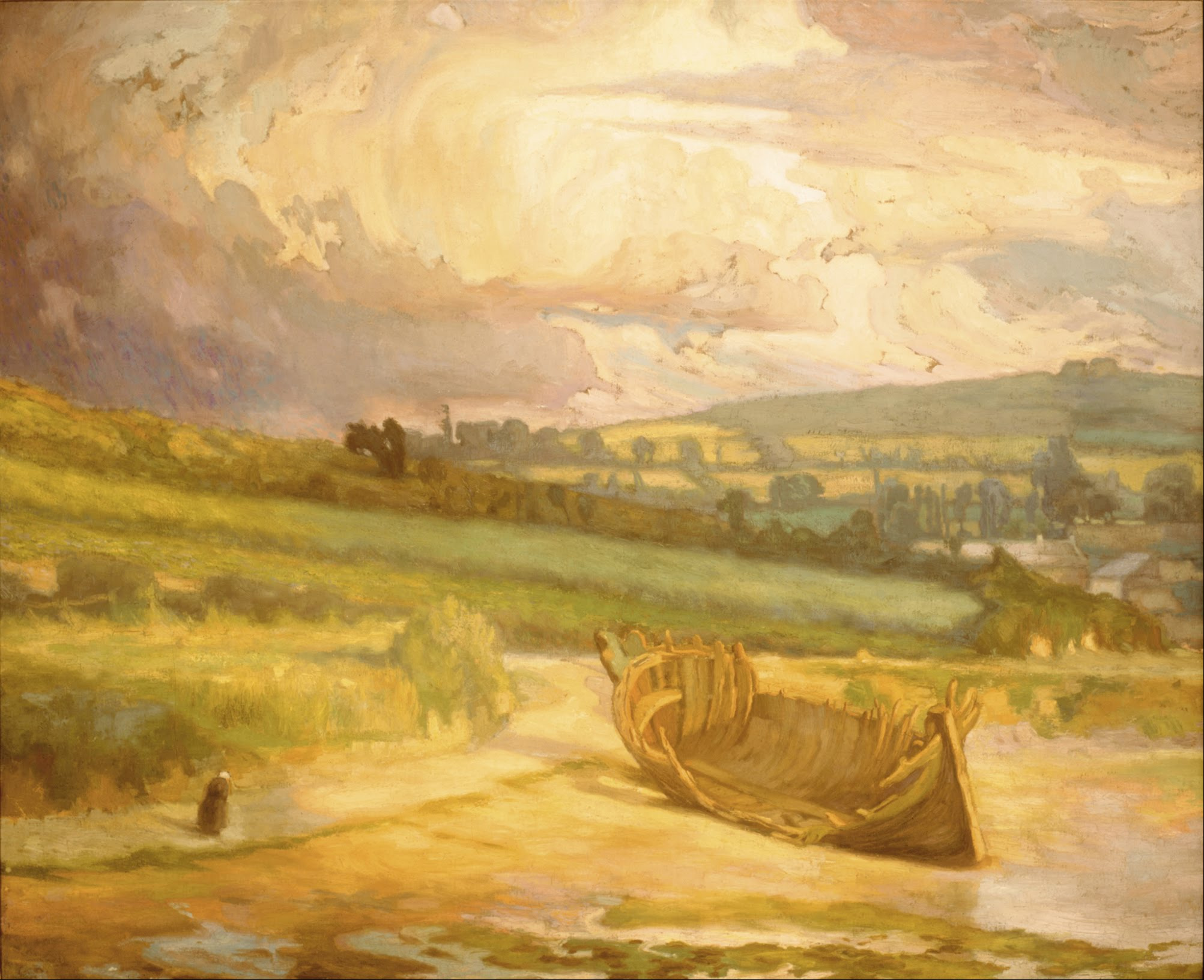
After the Storm (The Grounded Ship), 1910, 120.7 × 146.7 cm. Museo Nacional de Arte

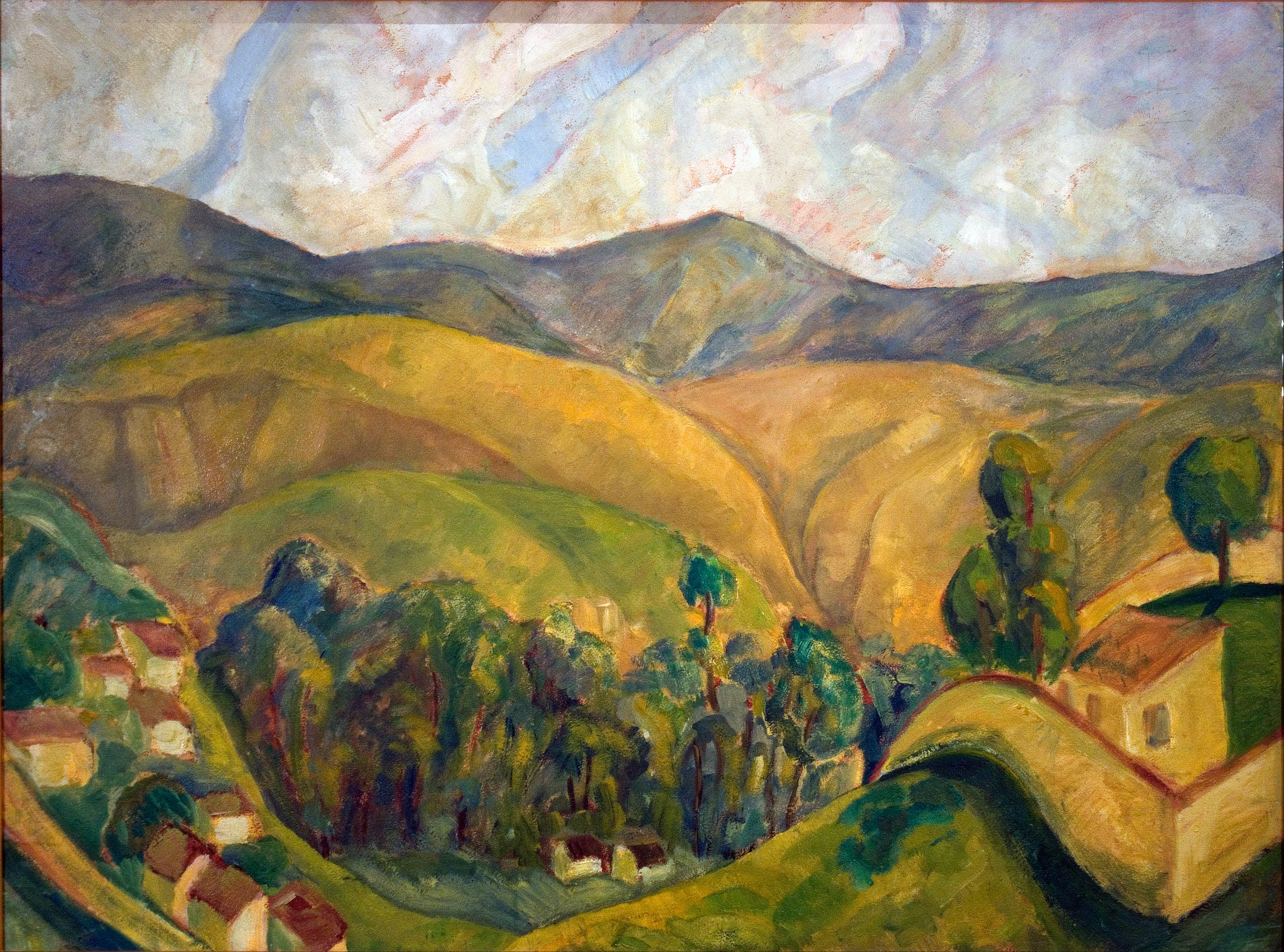
Landscape, 1911. Frida Kahlo Museum.

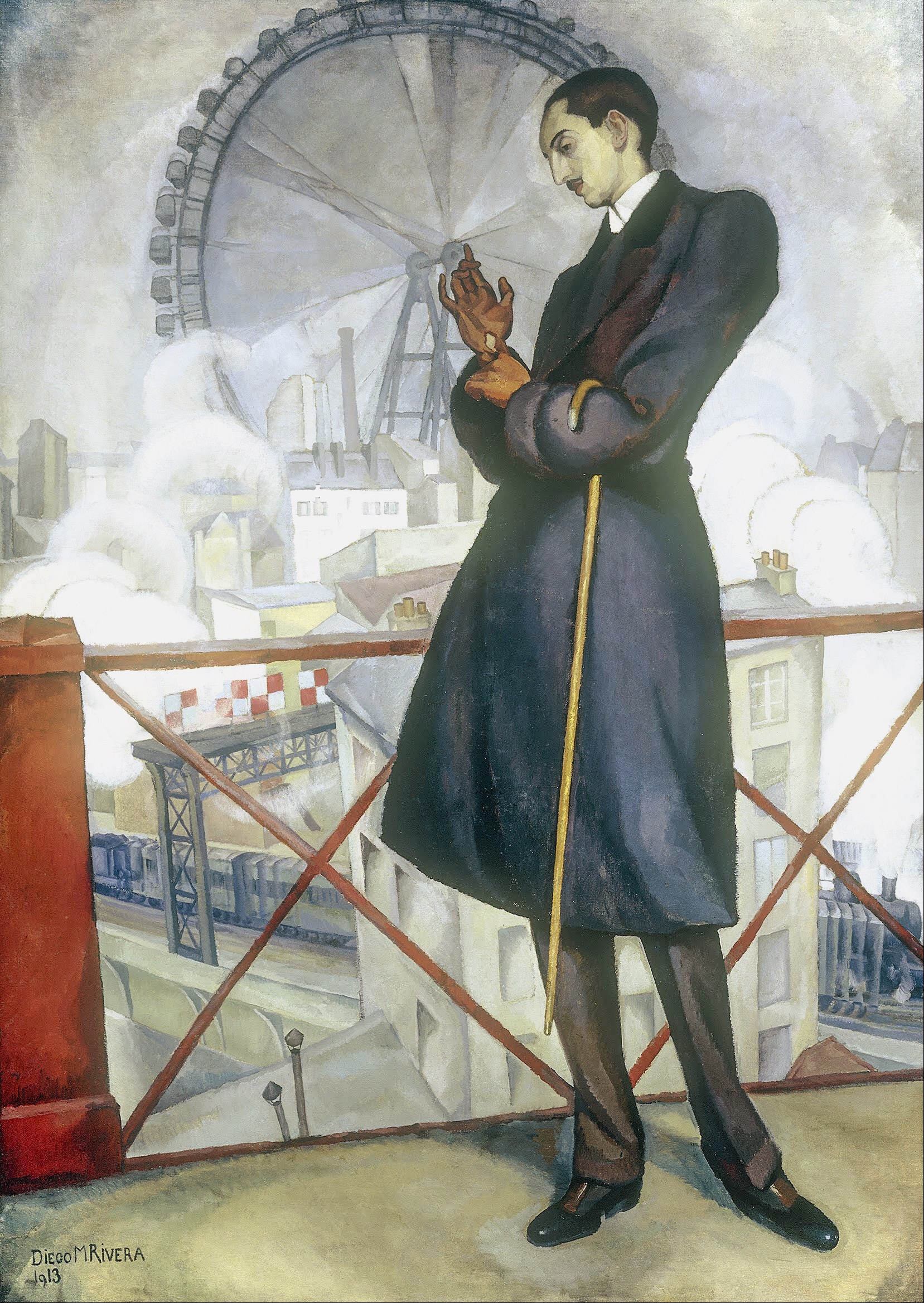
Portrait of Adolfo Best Maugard, 1913, 227.5 × 161.5 cm. Museo Nacional de Arte

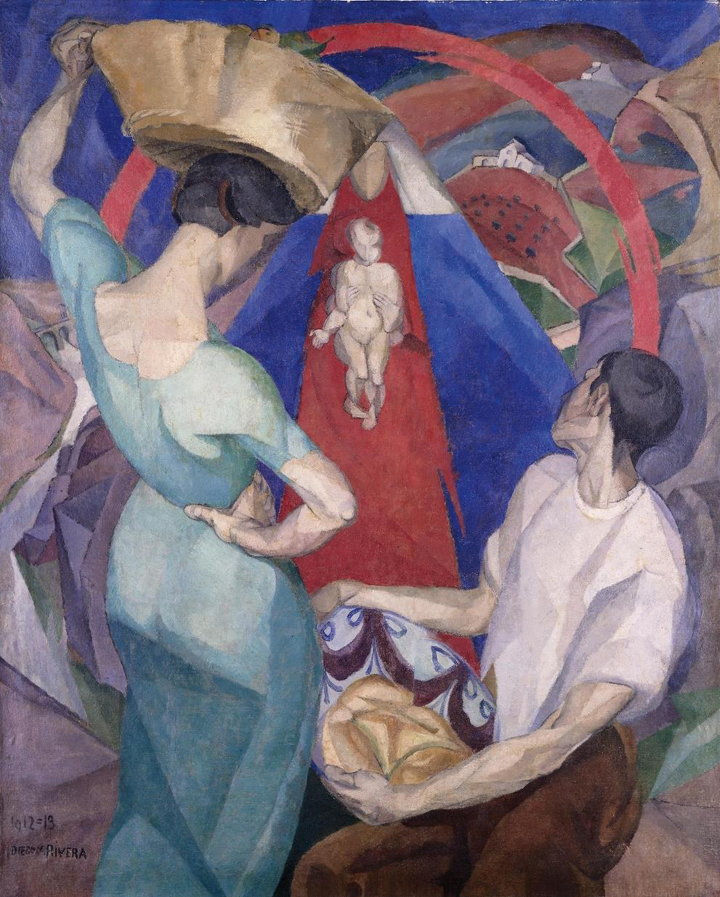
Adoration of the Virgin and Child, 1912–13, oil and encaustic on canvas, 150 × 120 cm, private collection

The Sun Breaking through the Mist, 1913, 83.5 × 59 cm. Museo Dolores Olmedo

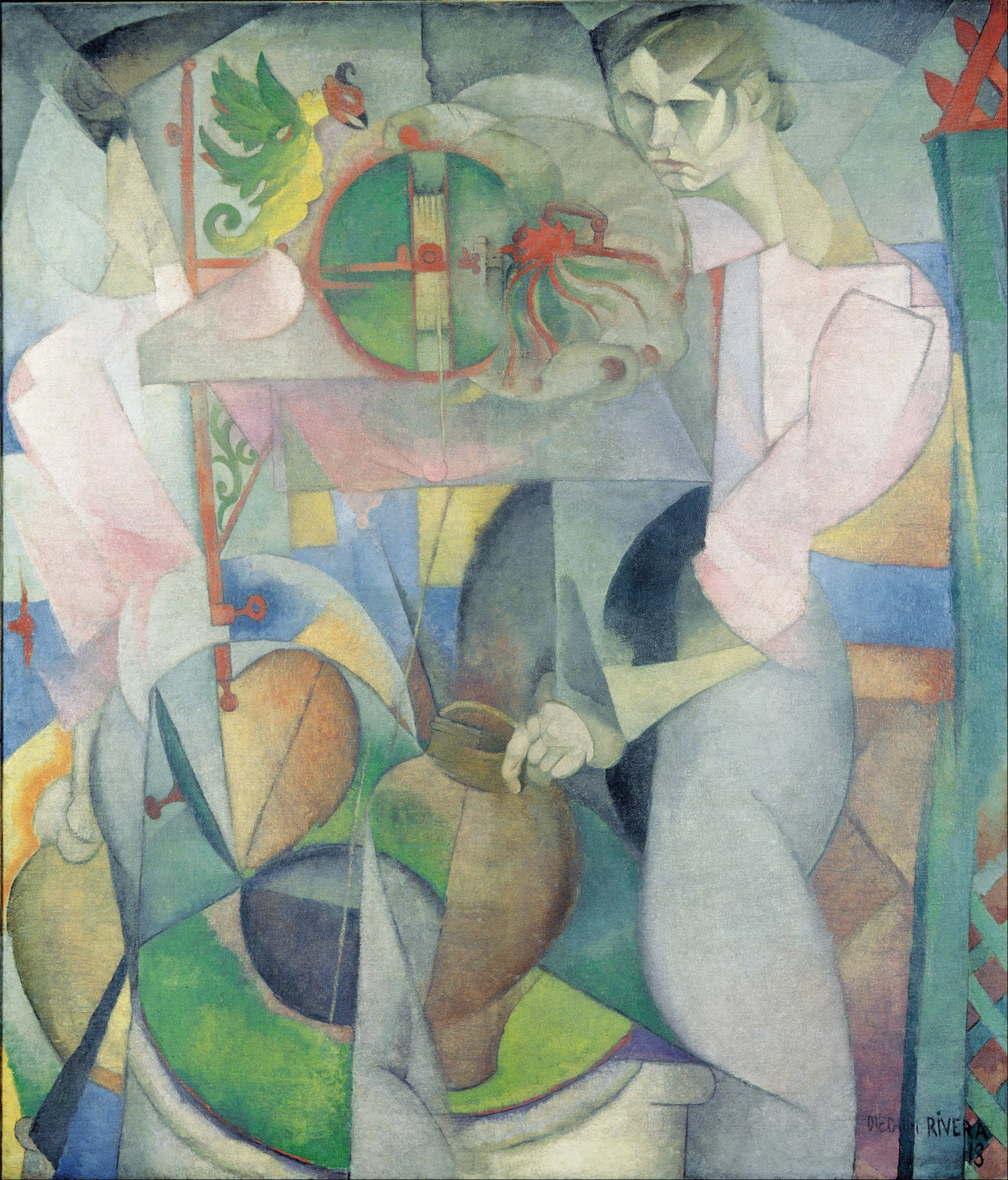
The Woman at the Well, 1913, 145 × 125 cm. Museo Nacional de Arte

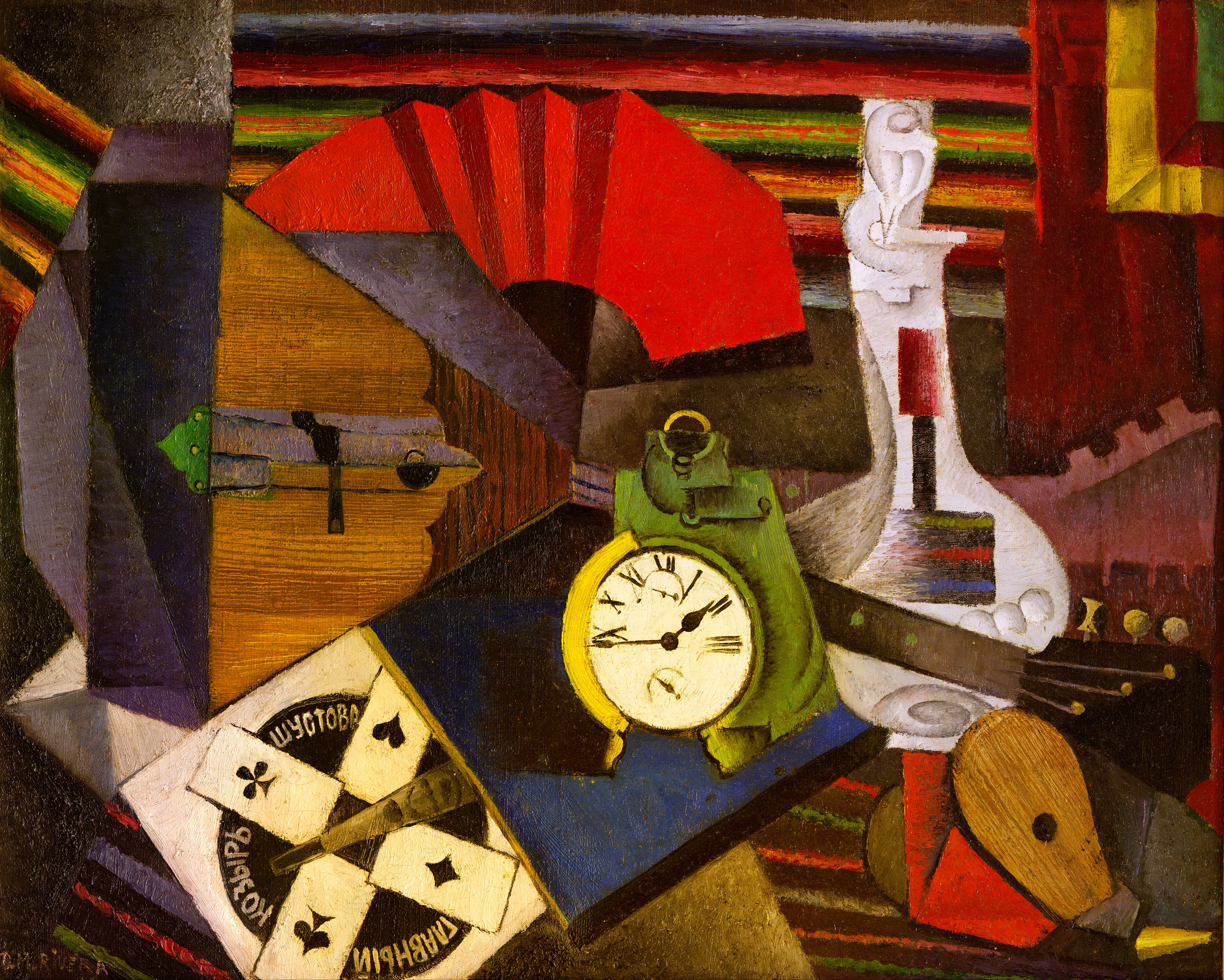
The Alarm Clock, 1914. Frida Kahlo Museum

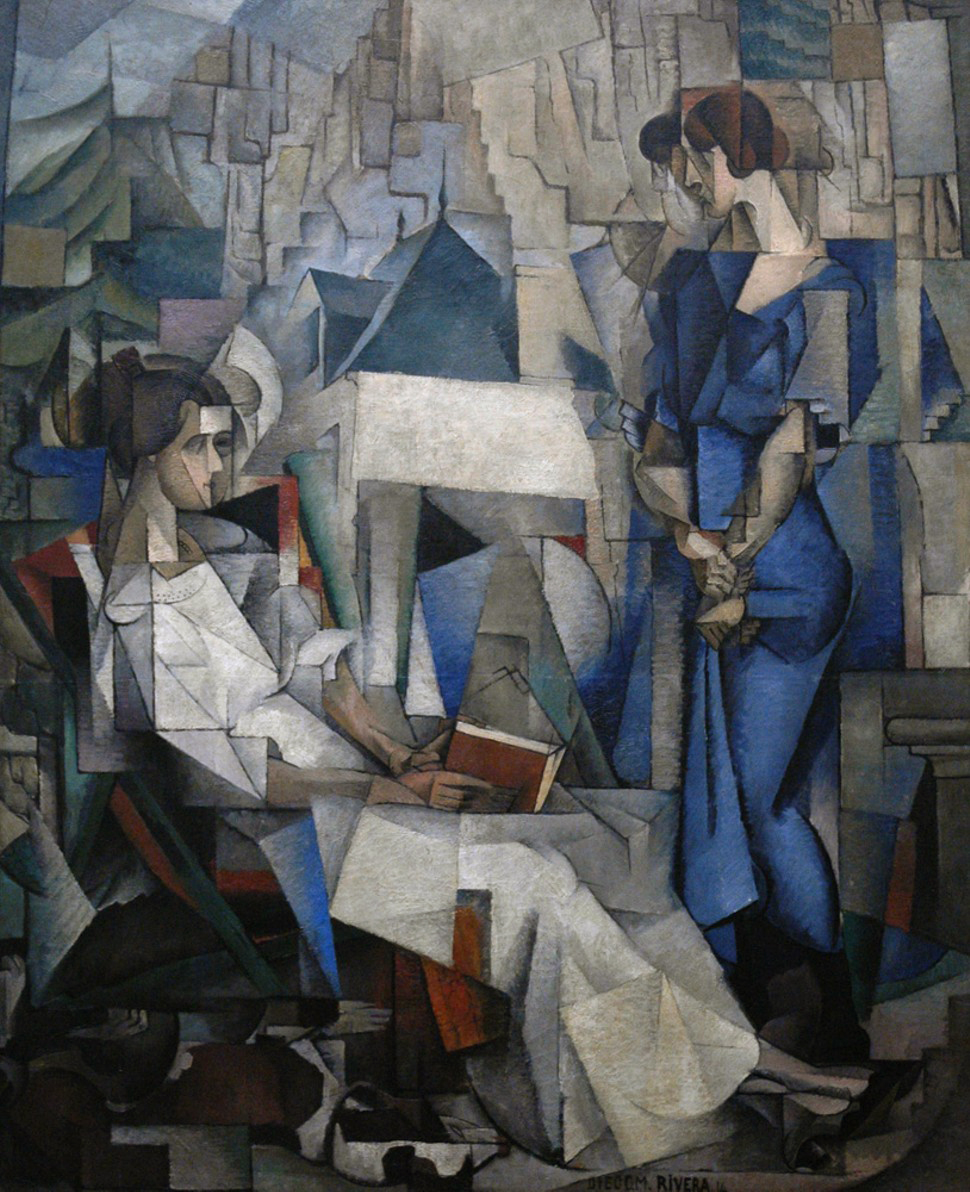
Two Women (Dos Mujeres, Portrait of Angelina Beloff and Maria Dolores Bastian), 1914, 197.5 × 161.3 cm. Arkansas Arts Center

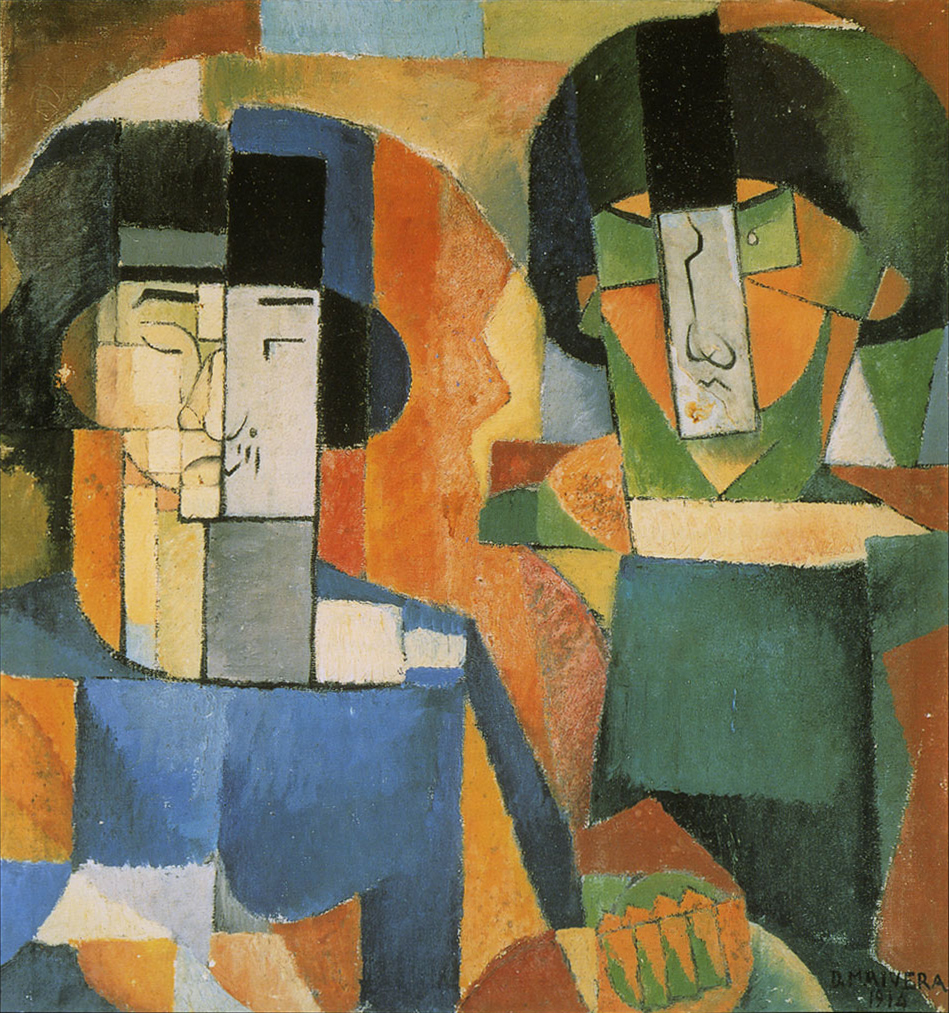
Portrait de Messieurs Kawashima et Foujita, 1914, oil and collage on canvas, 78.5 × 74 cm. Private collection

Young Man with a Fountain Pen, 1914, 79.5 × 63.5 cm. Museo Dolores Olmedo

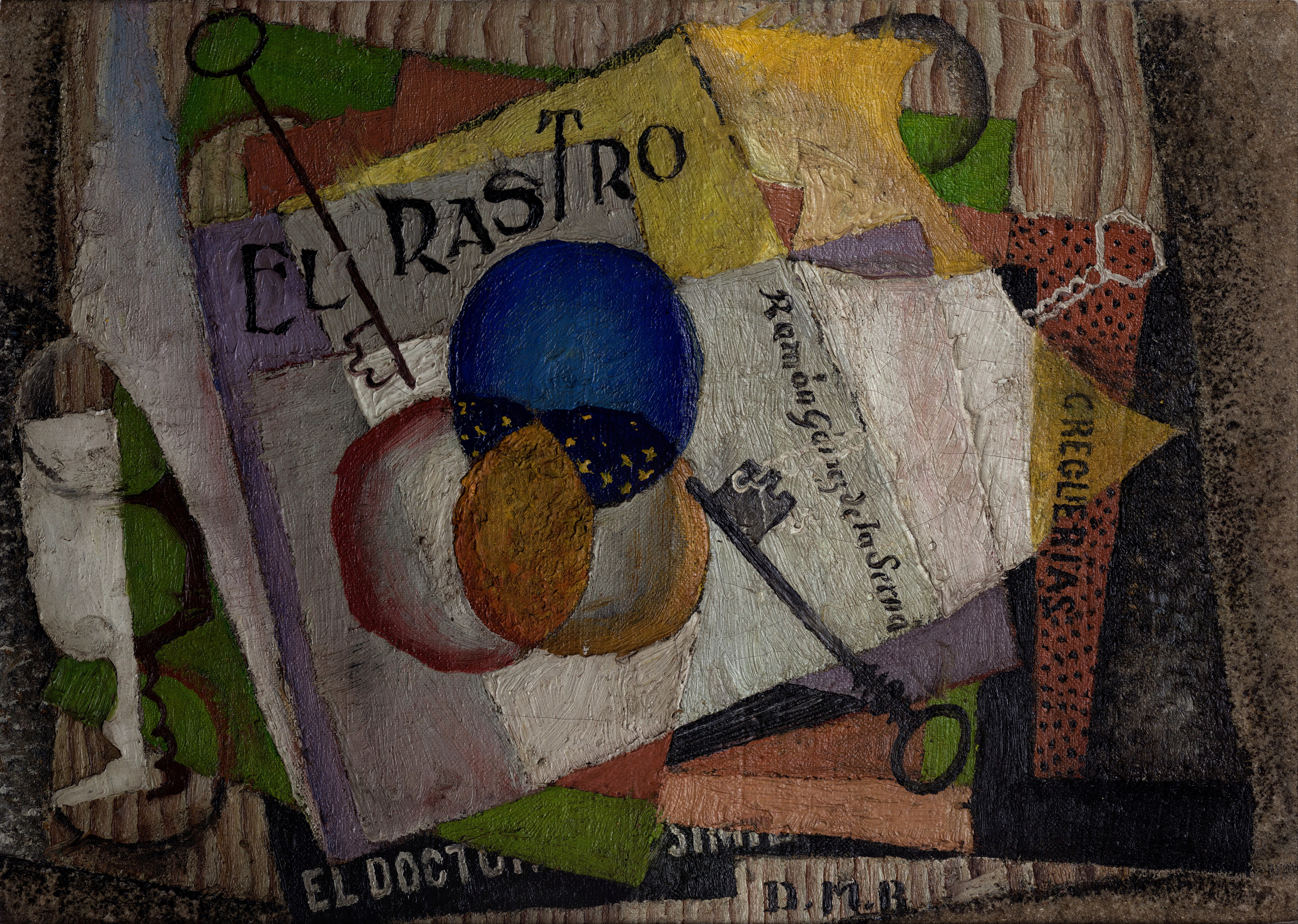
El Rastro, 1915, 27.5 × 38.5 cm. Museo Dolores Olmedo

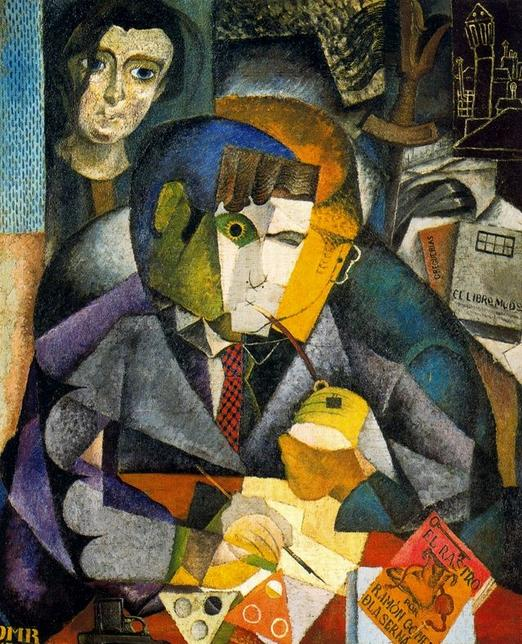
Portrait of Ramón Gómez de la Serna, 1915, 109.6 × 90.2 cm. Latin American Art Museum of Buenos Aires

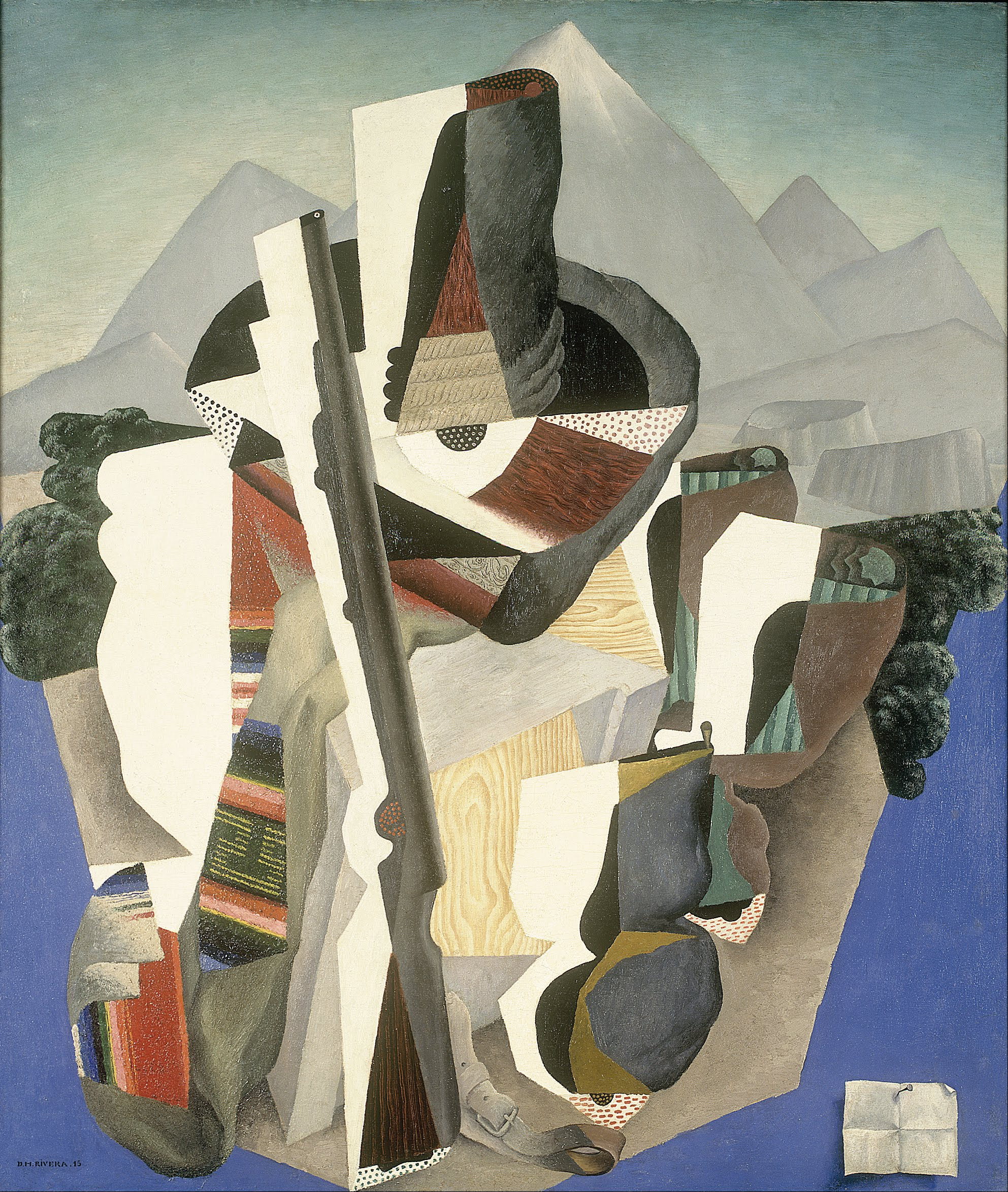
Zapata-style Landscape, 1915, 145 × 125 cm. Museo Nacional de Arte

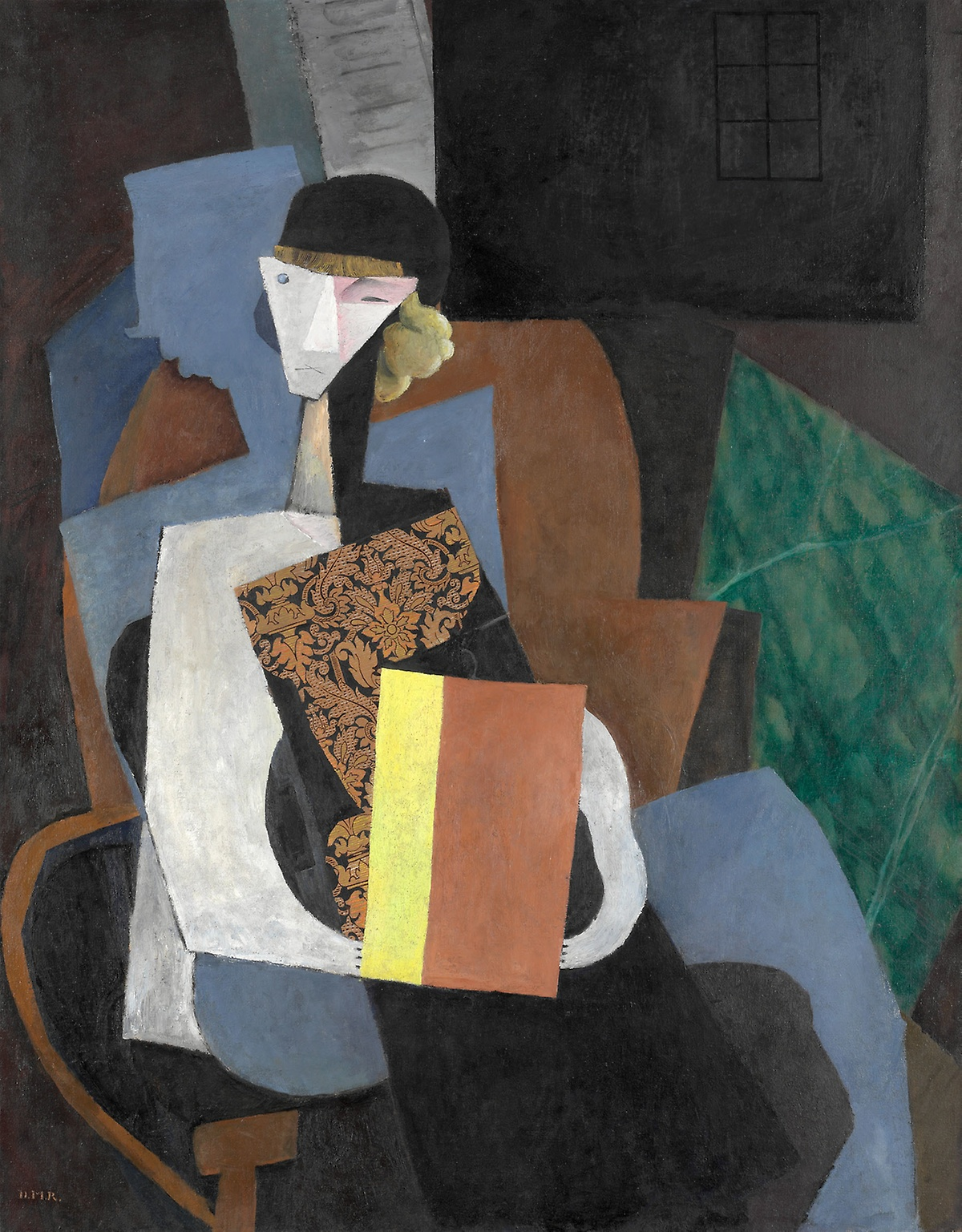
Portrait of Marevna, c. 1915, 145.7 × 112.7 cm. Art Institute of Chicago

Seated Woman (Women with the Body of a Guitar), 1915–16. Frida Kahlo Museum

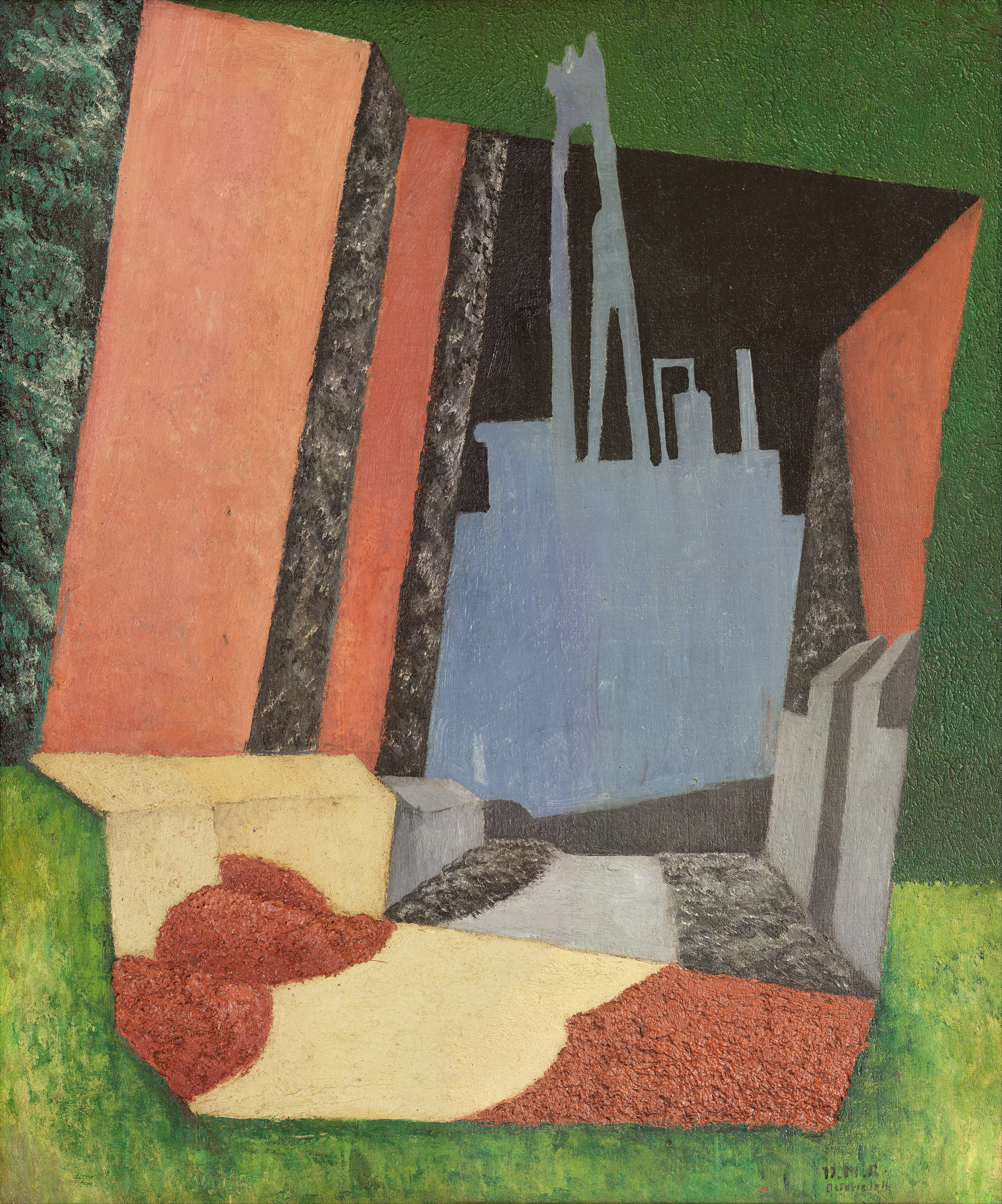
Urban Landscape, 1916. Frida Kahlo Museum

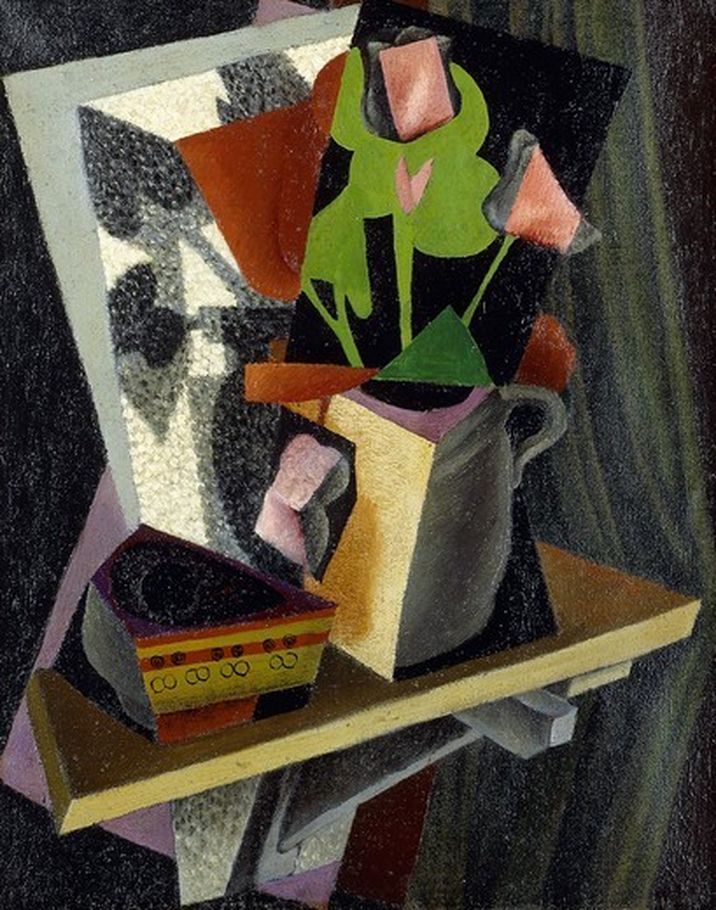
Still Life with Tulips (Naturaleza Muerta con Tulipanes), 1916, oil on canvas, 67.8 × 53.7 cm

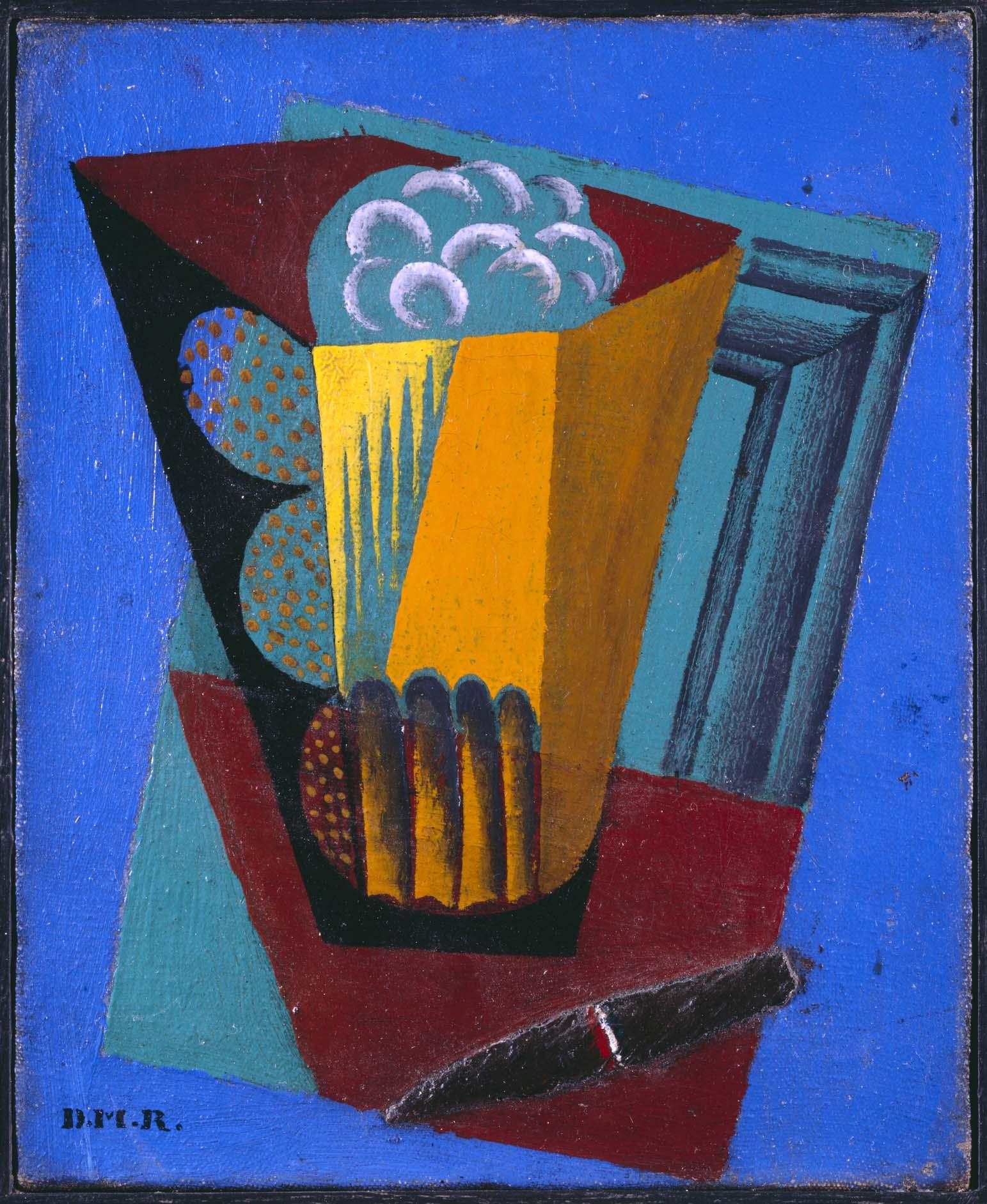
Le bock, 1917, Museo Nacional Centro de Arte Reina Sofía

Knife and Fruit in Front of the Window, 1917, 91.8 × 92.4 cm. Museo Dolores Olmedo

Still Life with Utensils, 1917, 71 × 54 cm. Museo Dolores Olmedo

The Mathematician, 1919, 115.5 × 80.5 cm. Museo Dolores Olmedo

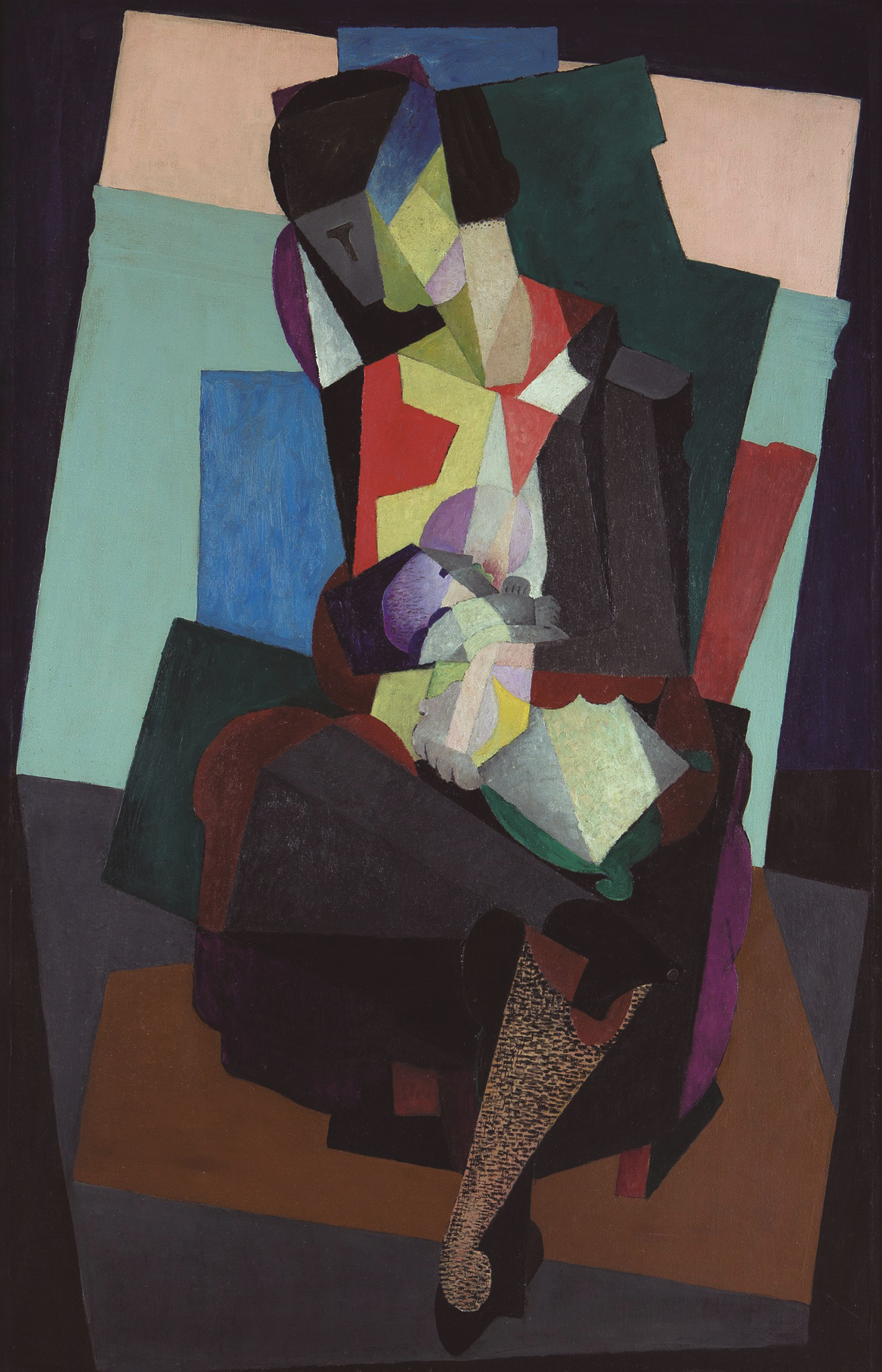
Maternidad, Angelina y el niño Diego (Motherhood, Angelina and the Child Diego), c. August 1916, oil on canvas, 134.5 × 88.5 cm, Museo de Arte Carrillo Gil. This work forms part of Rivera's Crystal Cubist period

The Outskirts of Paris, 1918

Still Life with Ricer also known as Still Life with Garlic Press, 1918

Bather of Tehuantepec, 1923

Flower day (Día de flores), 1925, LACMA

Cargadora con perro, 1927

=== Murals ===
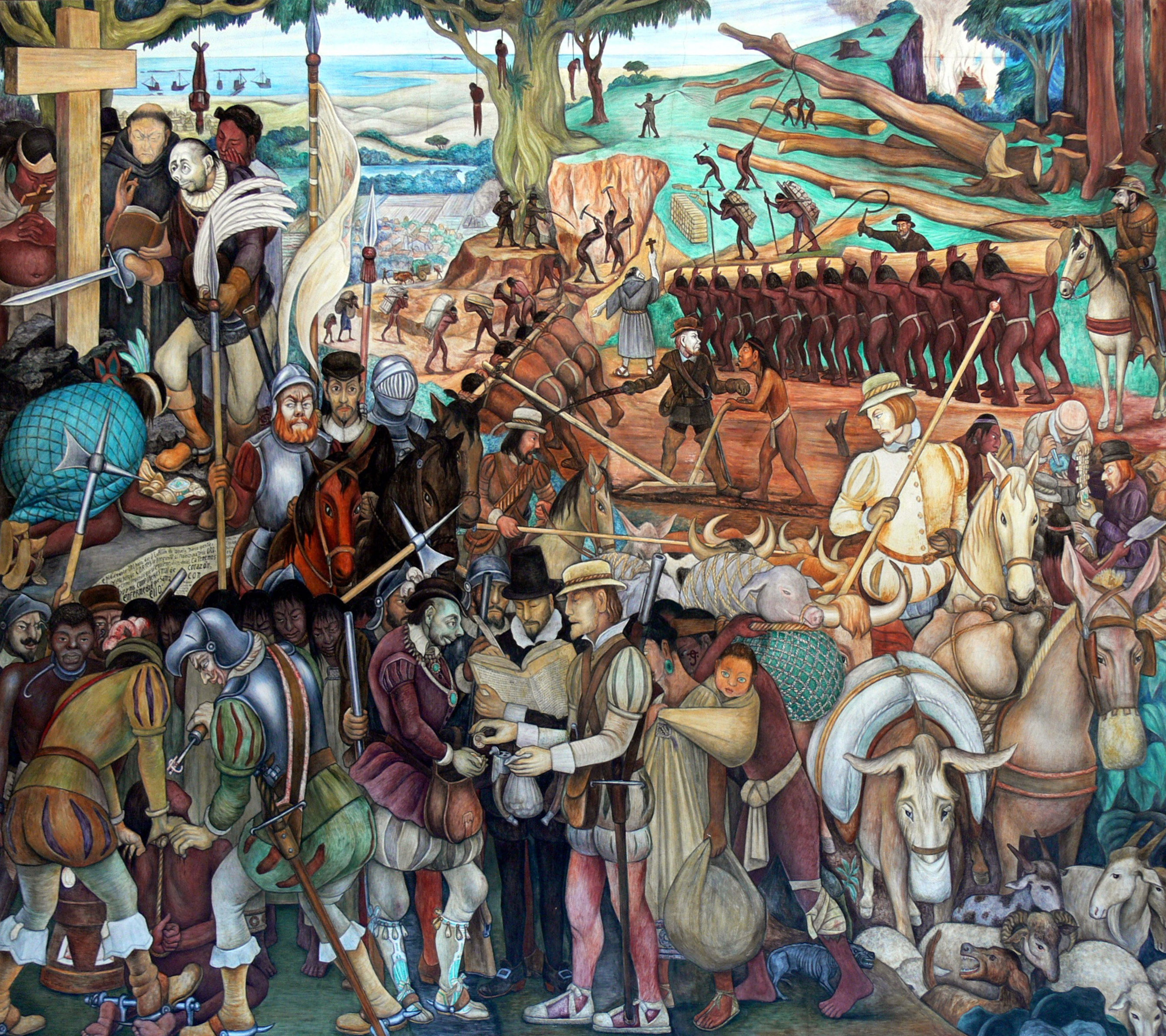
Mural of exploitation of Mexico by Spanish conquistadores, Palacio Nacional, Mexico City (1929–1945)

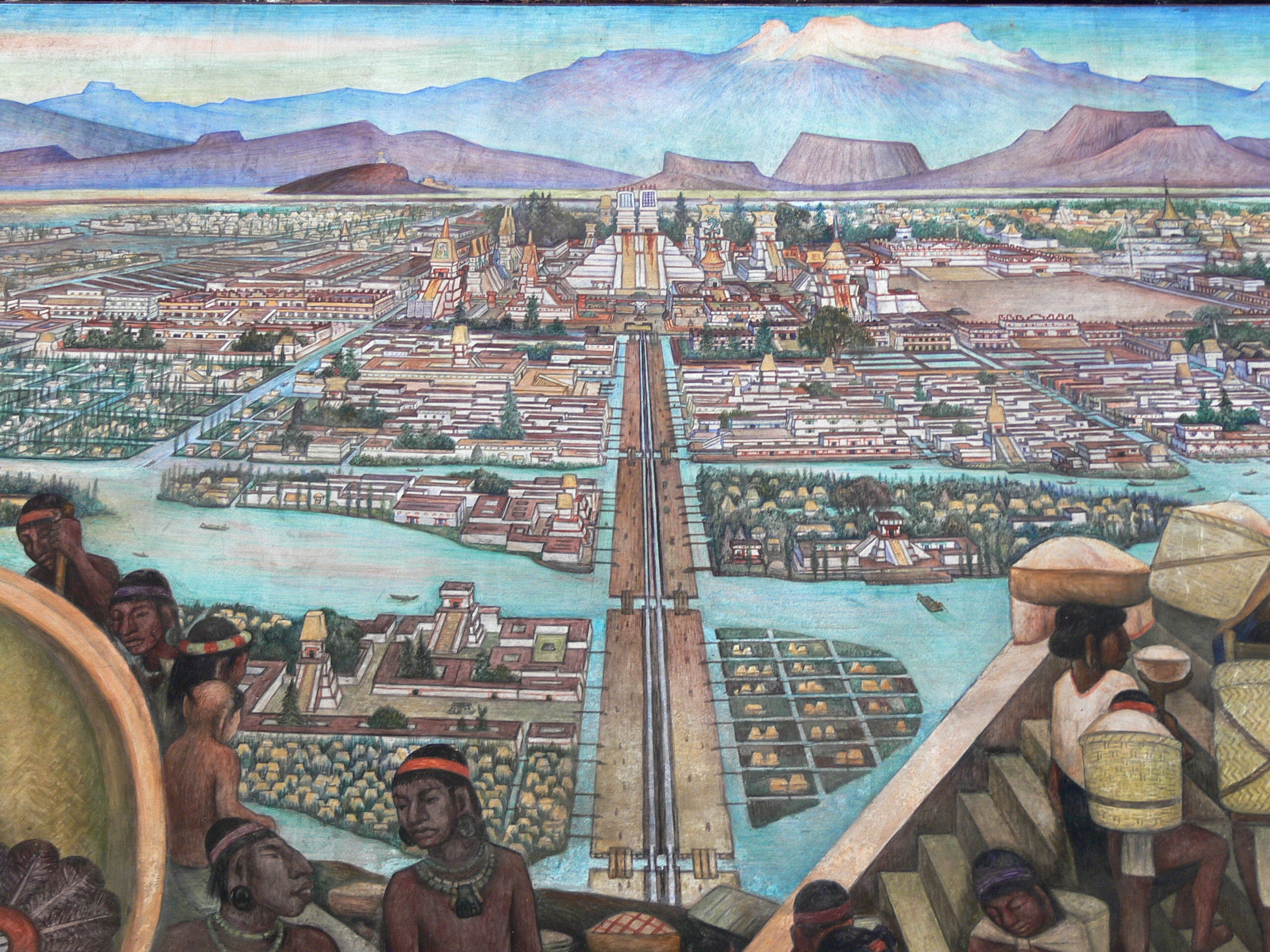
Mural of the Aztec city of Tenochtitlan, Palacio Nacional, Mexico City

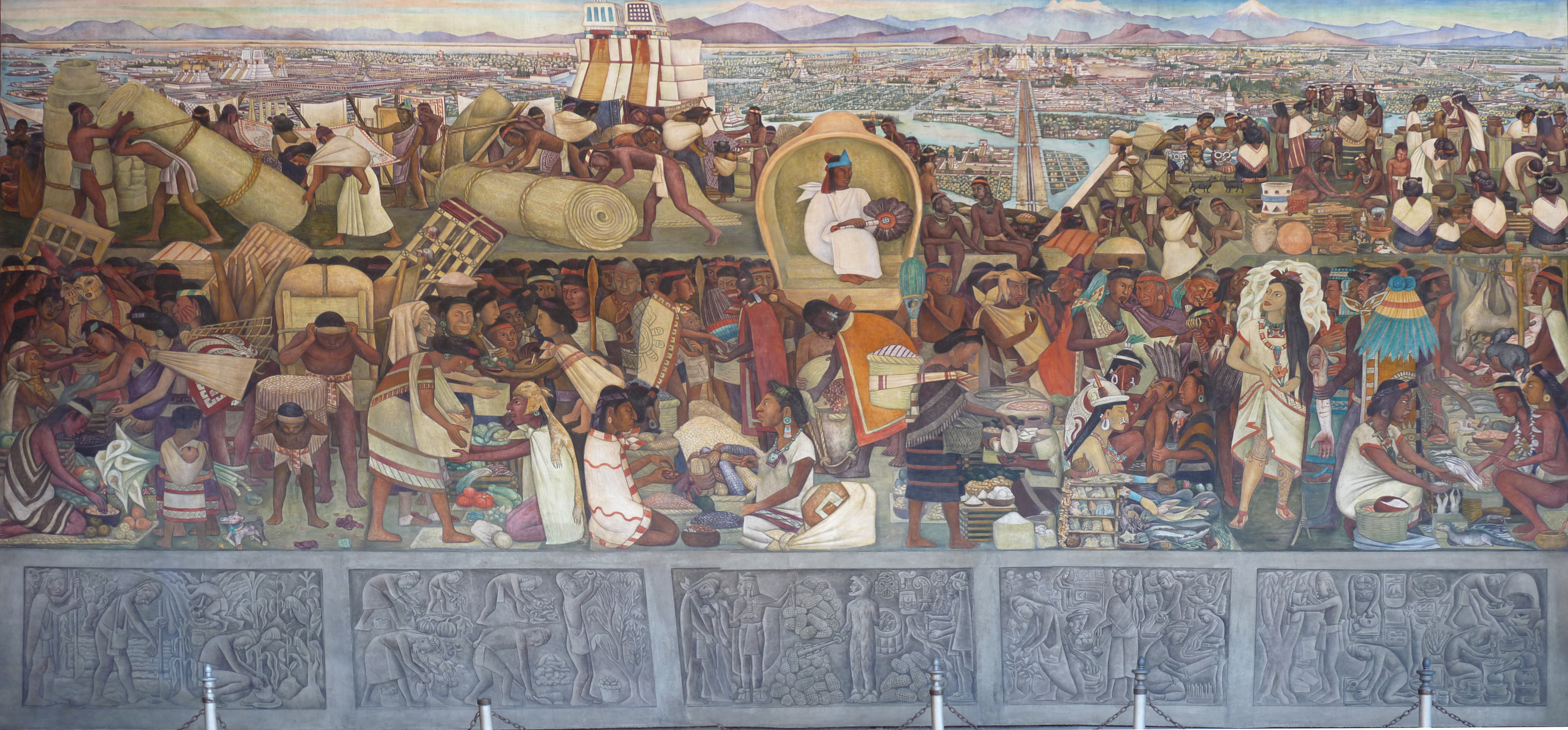
Mural of the Aztec market of Tlatelolco, Palacio Nacional, Mexico City

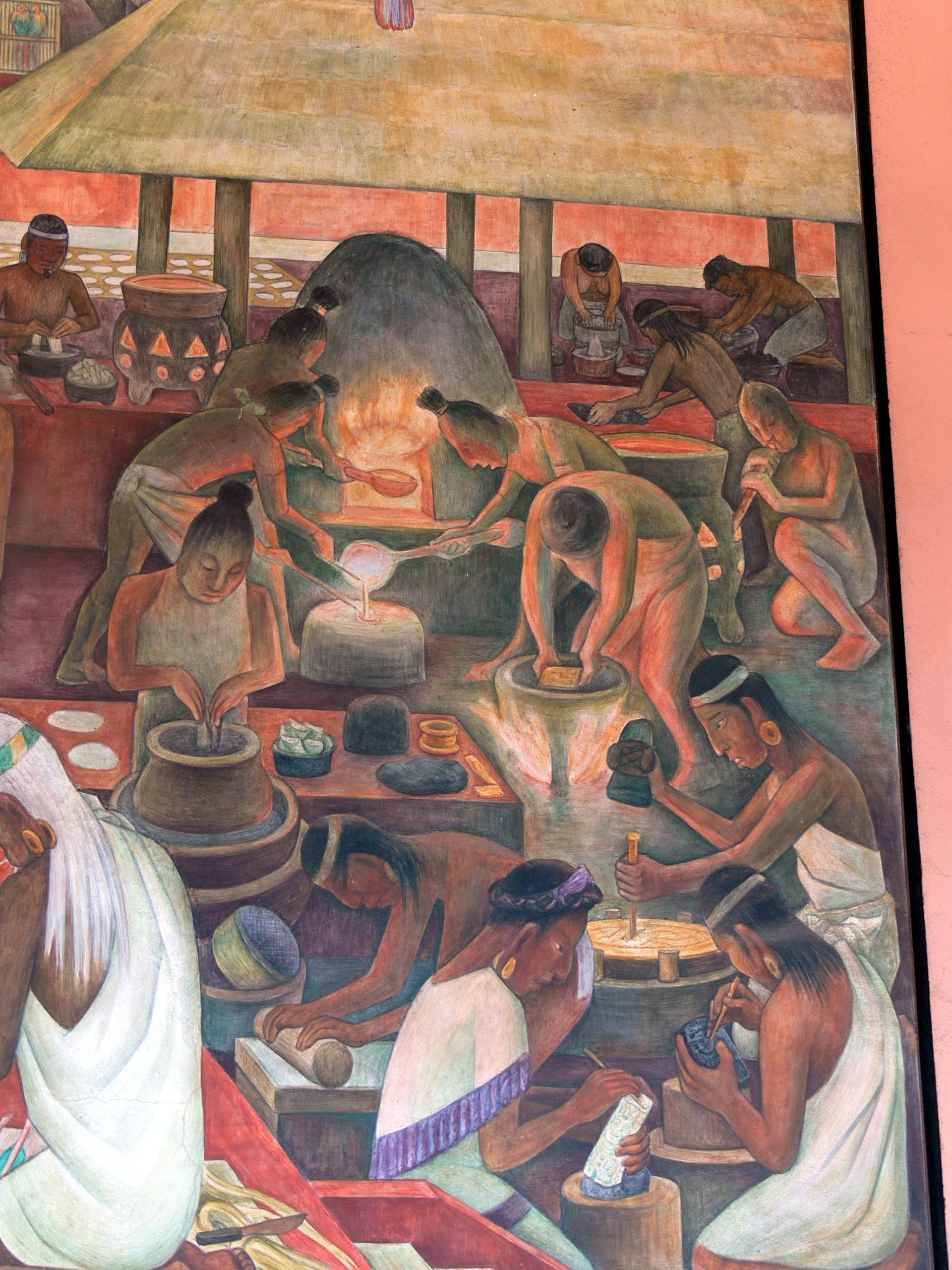
Mural showing Aztec production of gold, Palacio Nacional, Mexico City

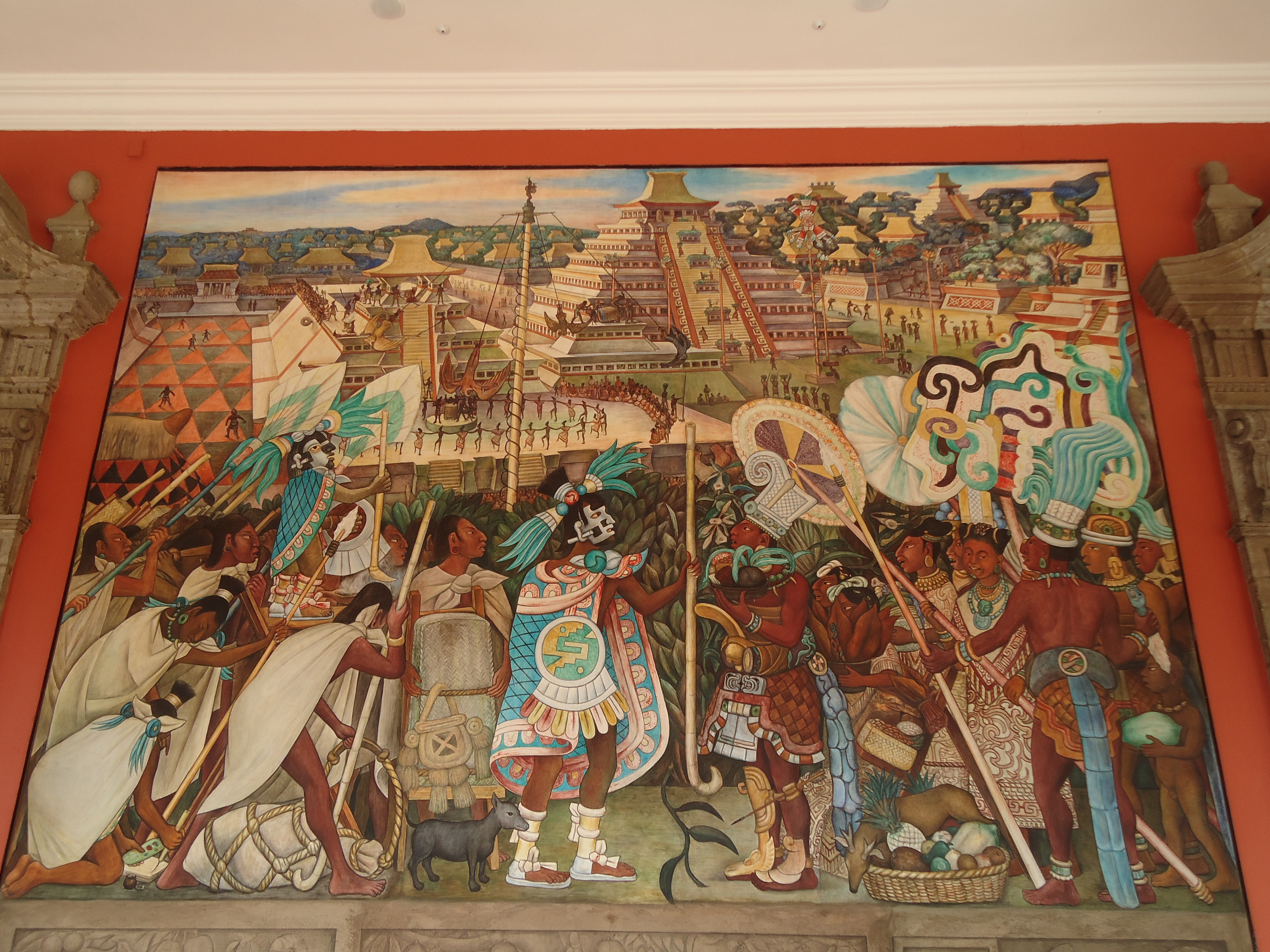
Mural showing Totonaca celebrations and ceremonies, Palacio Nacional, Mexico City

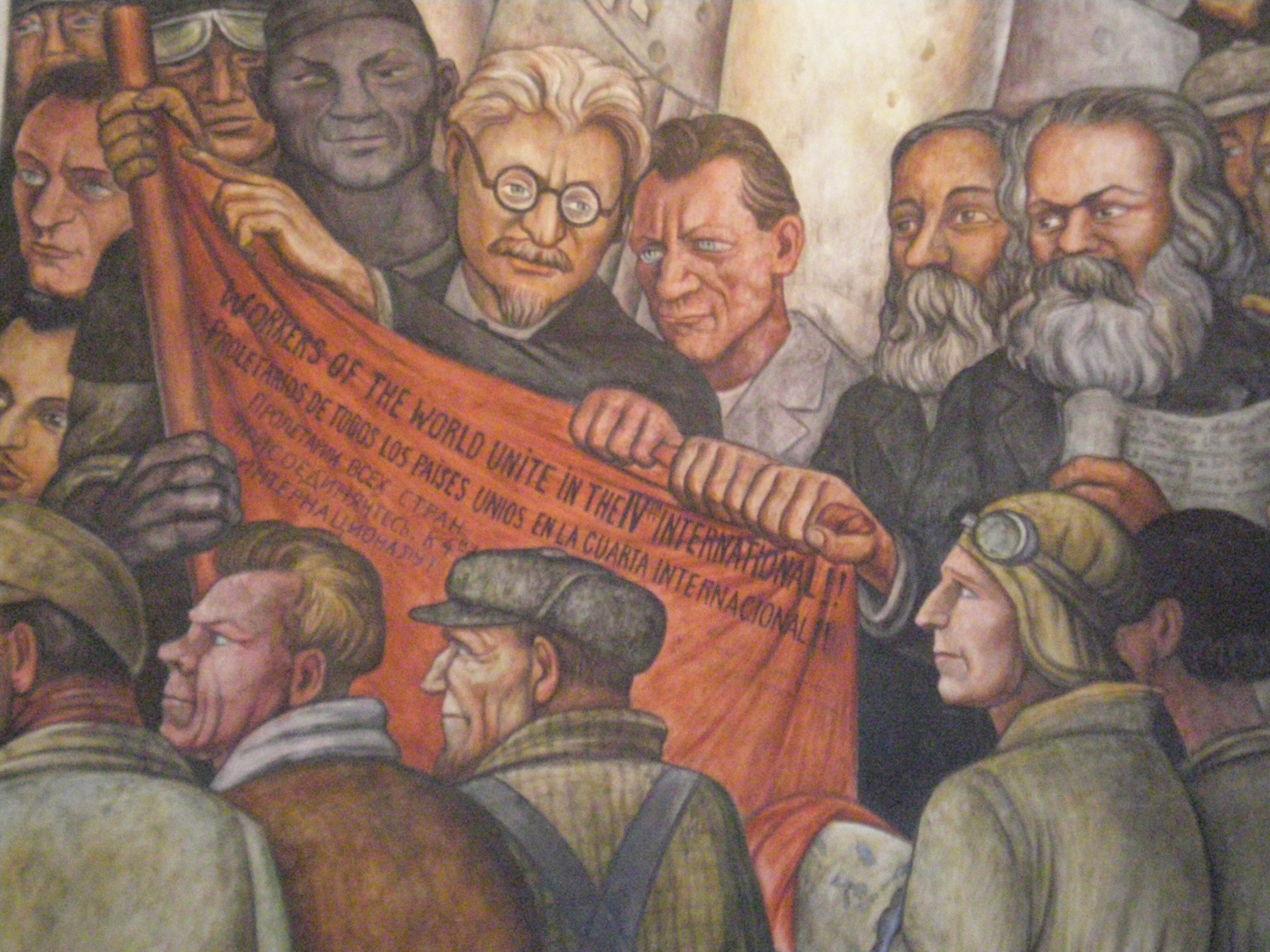
Detail of Man, Controller of the Universe, fresco at Palacio de Bellas Artes showing Leon Trotsky, Friedrich Engels, and Karl Marx

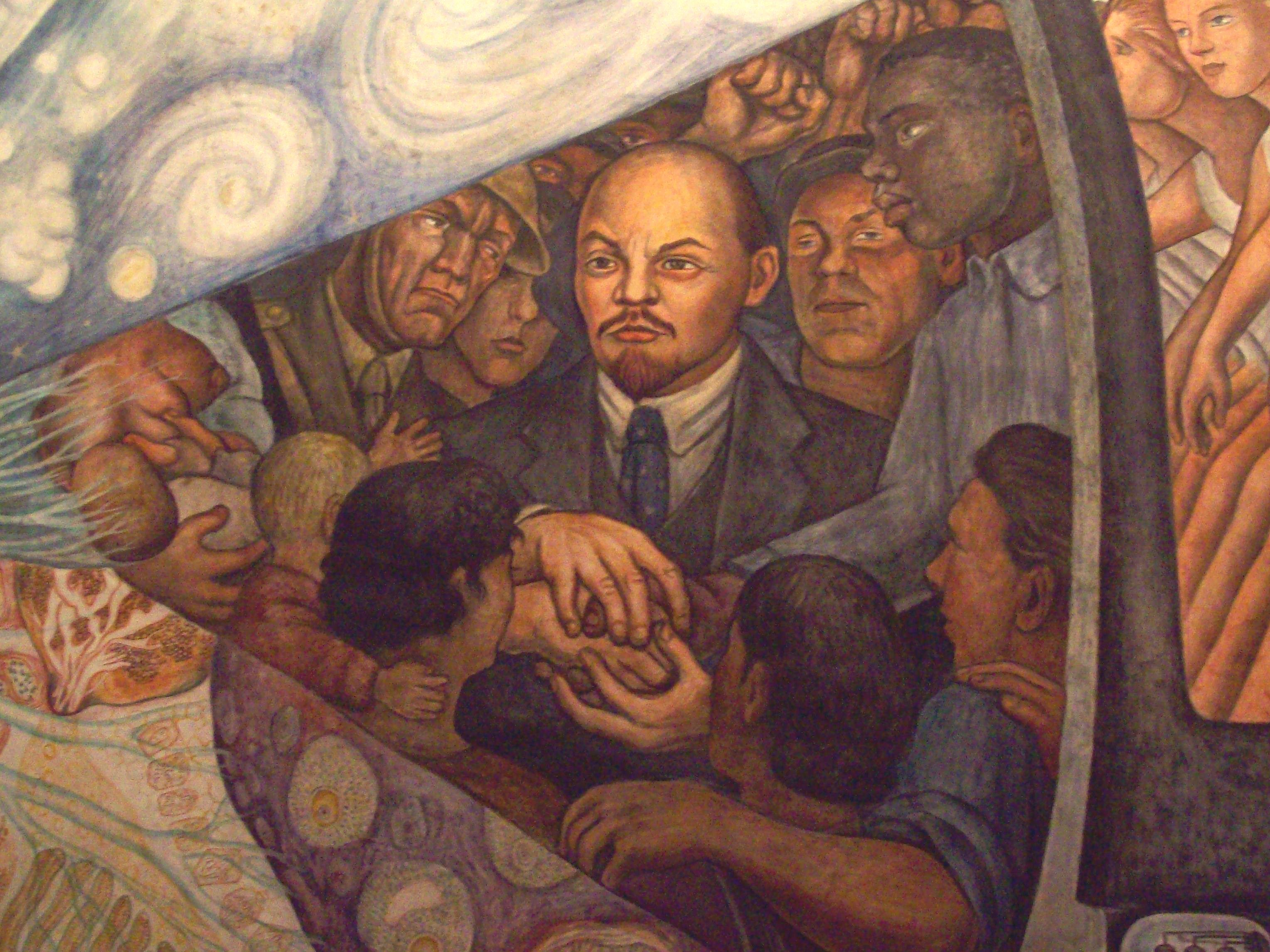
Detail of Man, Controller of the Universe, fresco at Palacio de Bellas Artes showing Vladimir Lenin

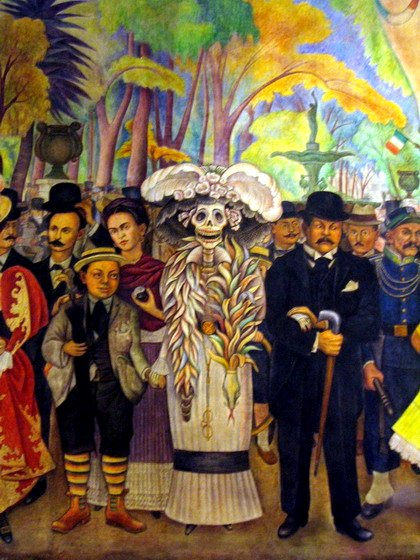
Mural (detail) Sueño de una Tarde Dominical en la Alameda Central in Mexico City, featuring Rivera and Frida Kahlo standing by La Calavera Catrina (width: 15.6 m)

Mural at the National Palace, Mexico City

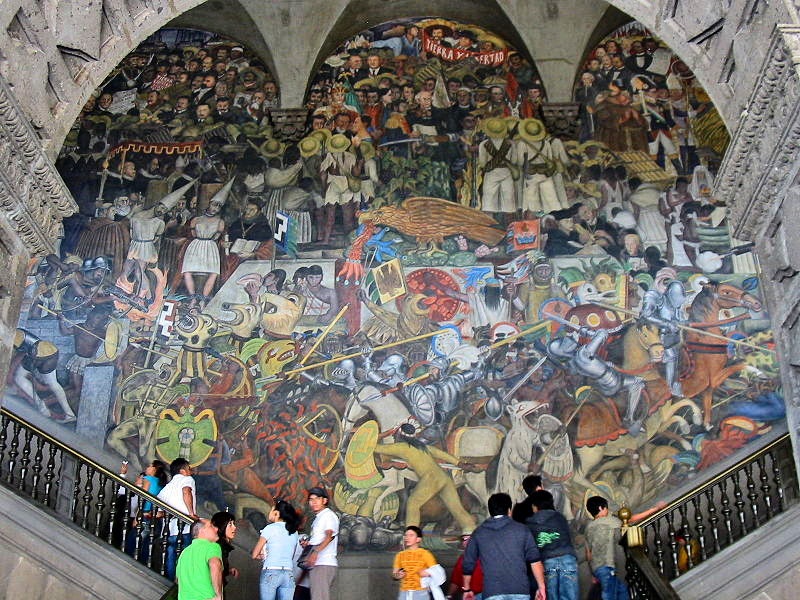
Diego Rivera's mural The History of Mexico at the National Palace in Mexico City

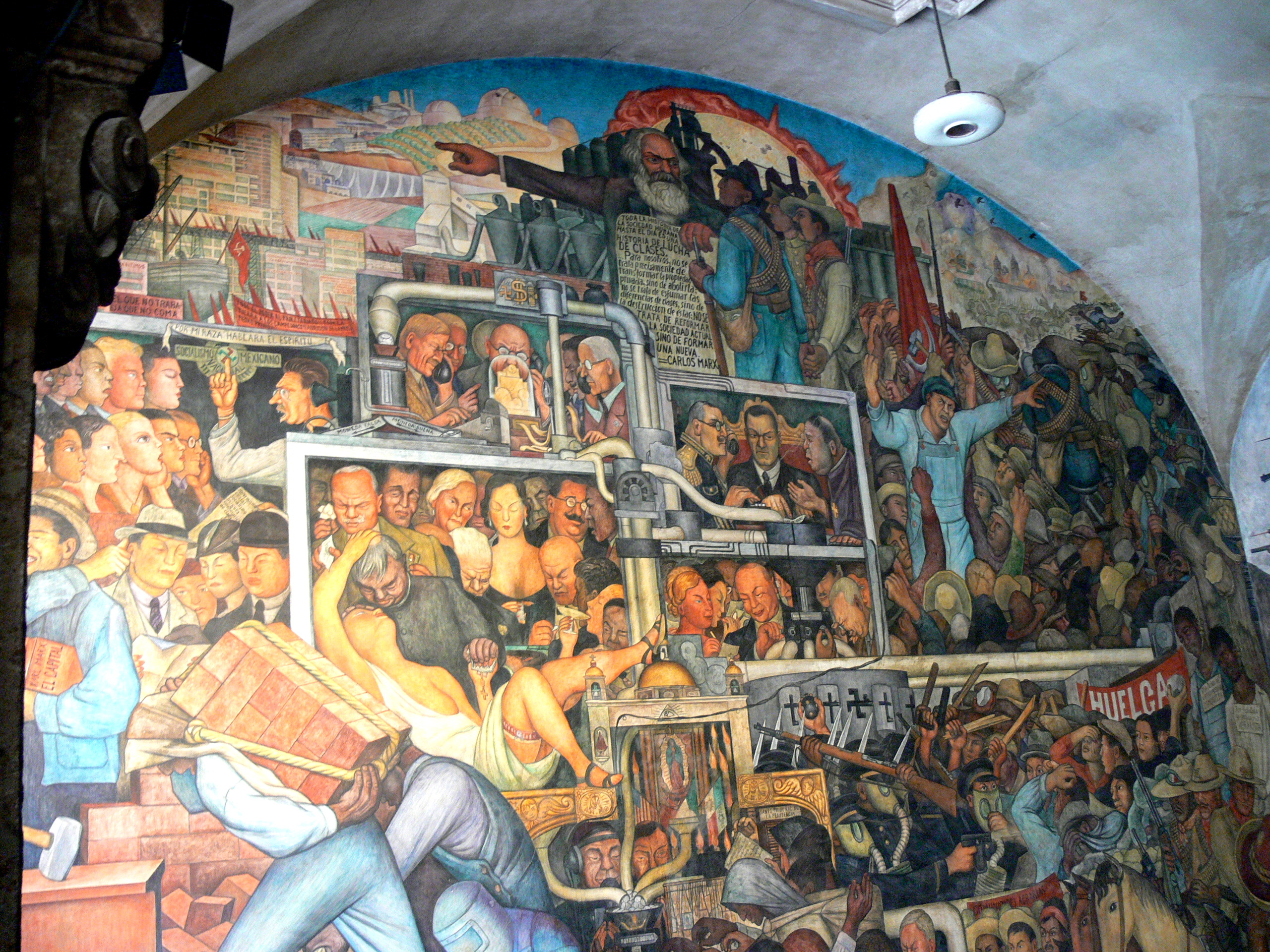
Detail of The History of Mexico showing betrayed revolution at Palacio Nacional, Mexico City

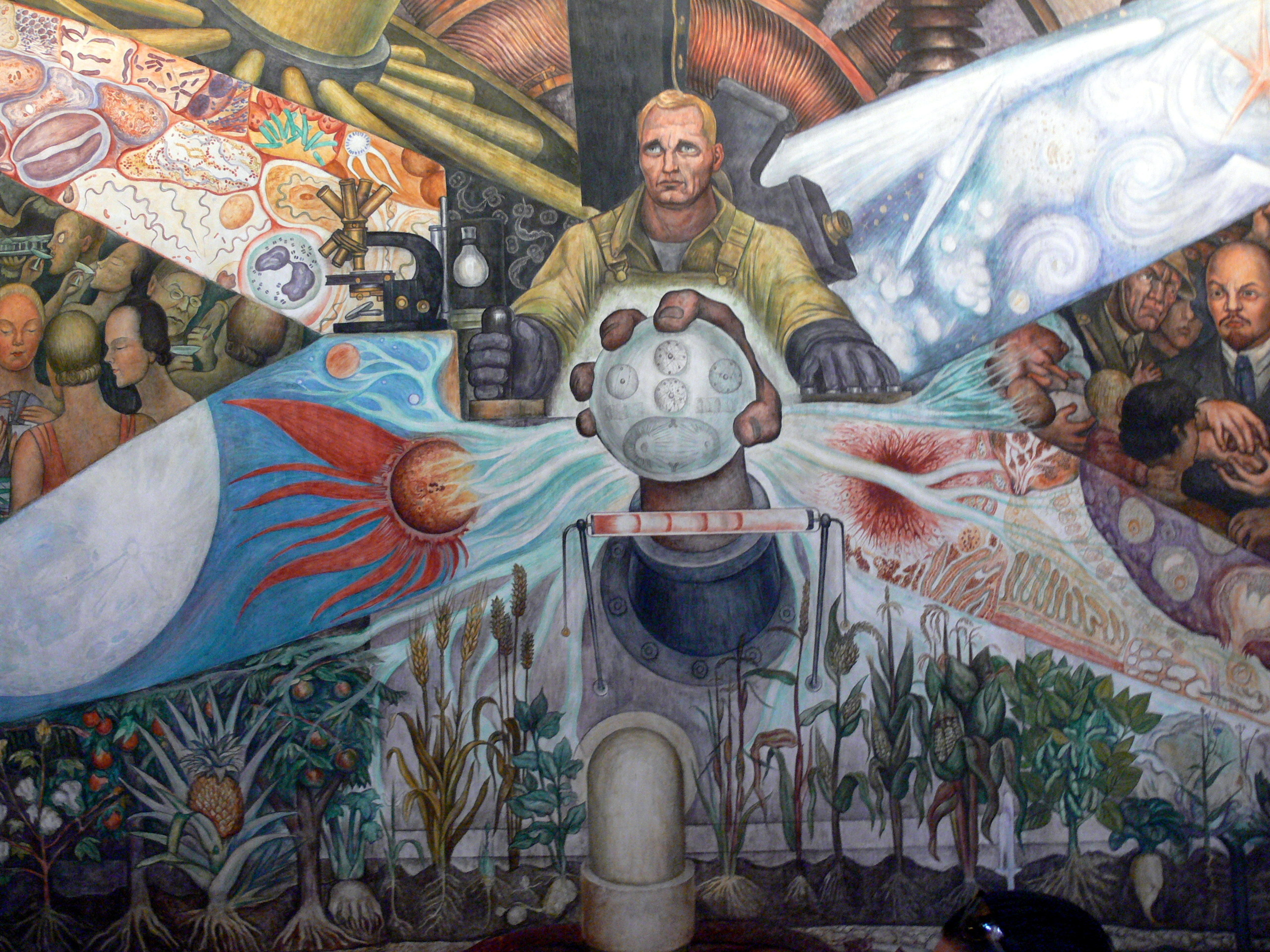
Recreation of Man at the Crossroads (renamed Man, Controller of the Universe), originally created in 1934 (detail)

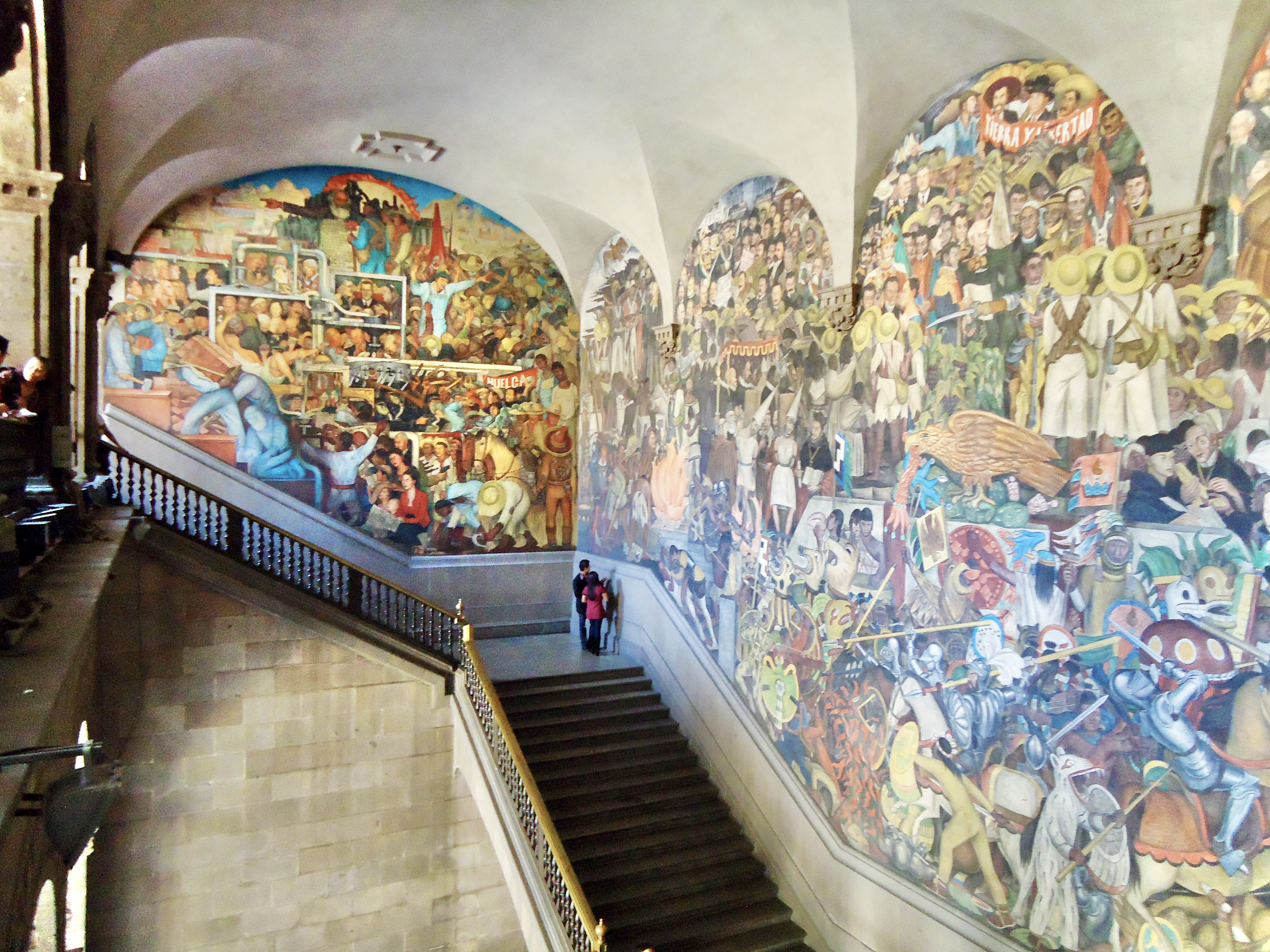
View of the Murals by Diego Rivera in the Palacio Nacional

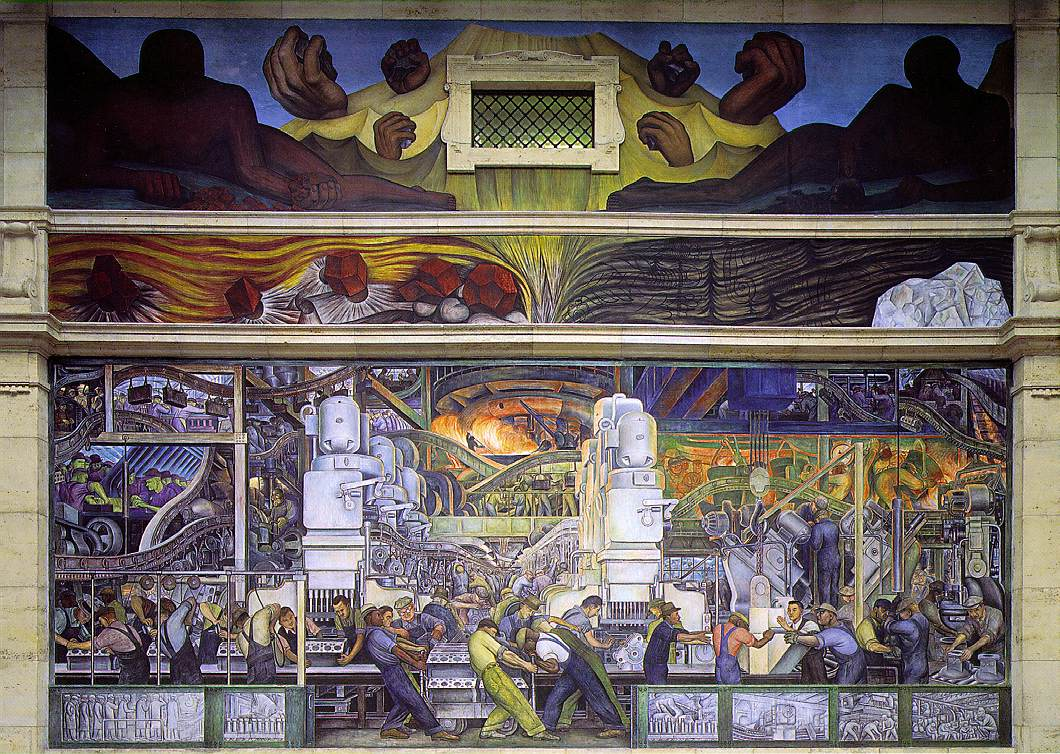
Detroit Industry, North Wall, 1932–33. Detroit Institute of Arts

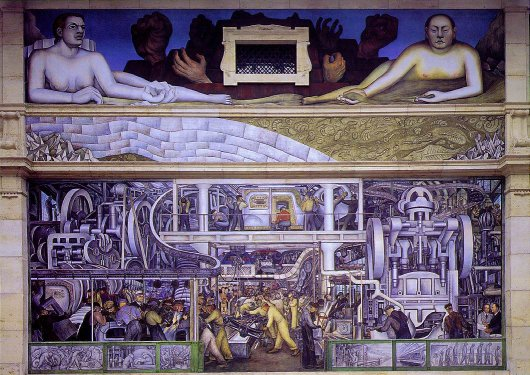
Detroit Industry, South Wall, 1932–33. Detroit Institute of Arts

=== Sculptures ===
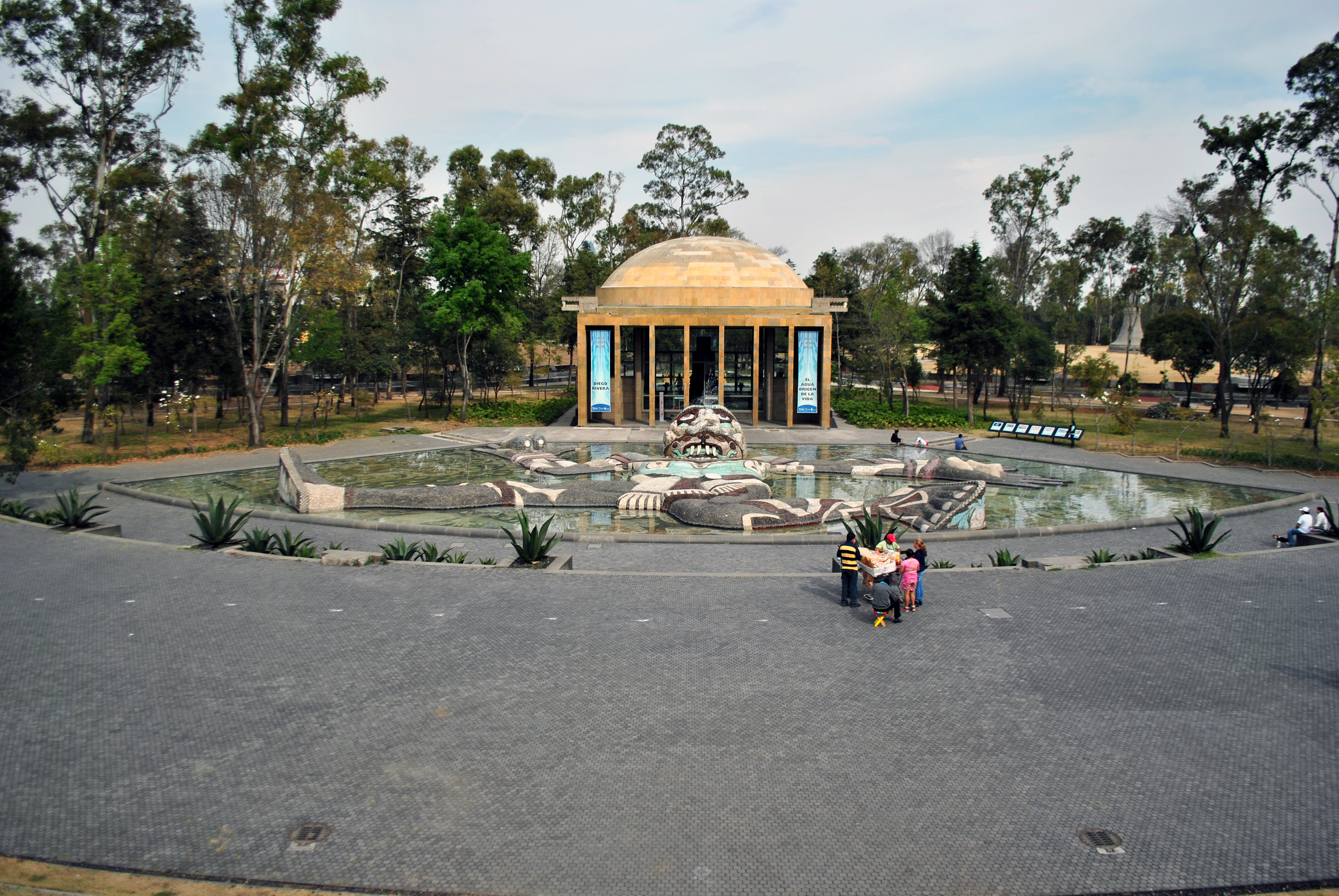
Tlaloc Fountain in Cárcamo de Dolores, Mexico City, 1951

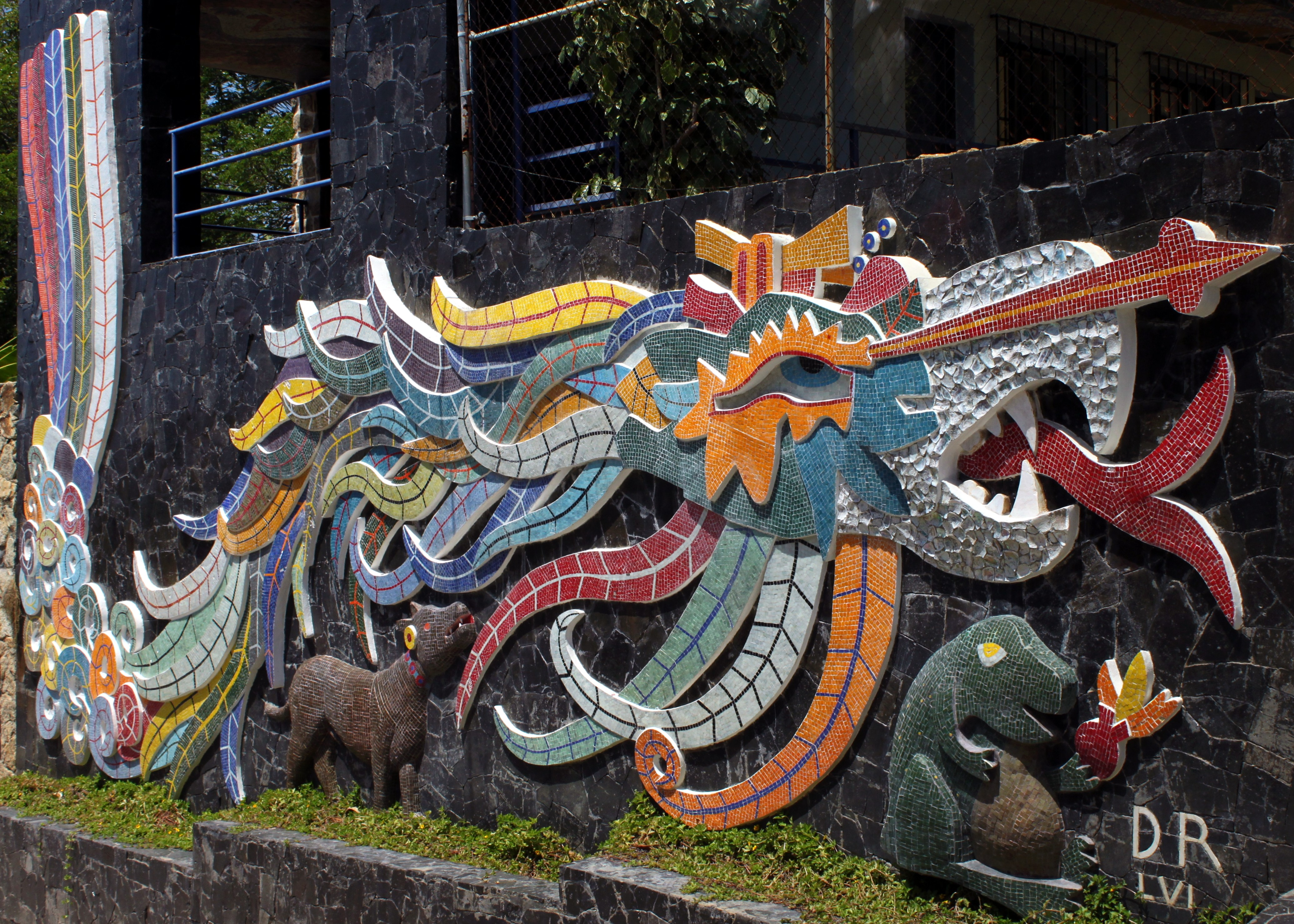
3D mural of Quetzalcóatl in the Exekatlkalli (Casa de los Vientos) in Acapulco, Guerrero, 1957

== Selected exhibitions ==
- 1986: Diego Rivera: A Retrospective, organized by the Centro Nacional de Exposiciones, Founders Society Detroit Institute of Arts, Instituto Nacional de Bellas Artes, Secretaría de Educación Pública and Secretaría de Relaciones Exteriores de México. It was exhibited at Detroit Institute of Arts, (February 10–April 27, 1986); Philadelphia Museum of Art, USA (June 2–August 10, 1986); Museo del Palacio de Bellas Artes, Mexico City (September 29, 1986 – January 4, 1987); Stäatliche Kunsthalle, Berlin (July 23–September 15, 1987); Hayward Gallery, Arts Council of Great Britain, London (October 29, 1987 – January 10, 1988). The catalog was edited by Cynthia Newman Helms ISBN 978-0-895-58118-1
- 2004: The Cubist Paintings of Diego Rivera, co-organized by the National Gallery of Art, Washington, D.C. (exhibited April 4–July 25, 2004) and Museo de Arte Moderno, Mexico City (exhibited September 22, 2004 – January 16, 2005) ASIN B005HFK0NA
- 2009: Diego Rivera: The Cubist Portraits, 1913–1917, The Meadows Museum, Dallas, Texas, June 21–September 20, 2009
- 2011: Diego Rivera: Murals for The Museum of Modern Art, Museum of Modern Art, New York, New York, November 13, 2011 – May 14, 2012; Diego Rivera: Murals for The Museum of Modern Art audio; catalog by Leah Dickerman and Anna Indych-López, ISBN 978-0-870-70817-6
- 2013: Frida & Diego: Passion, Politics, and Painting, High Museum of Art, Atlanta, Georgia, February 14 – May 12, 2013
- 2013: Diego Rivera in San Antonio, San Antonio Museum of Art, December 15, 2013 – December 1, 2014
- 2015: Diego Rivera and Frida Kahlo in Detroit, Detroit Institute of Arts, Detroit, Michigan, March 15–July 12, 2015
- 2015: Mexico in New Orleans: A Tale of Two Americas, LSU Museum of Art, Baton Rouge, Louisiana, May 5–September 6, 2015
- 2016: Picasso and Rivera: Conversations Across Time, The Los Angeles County Museum of Art (LACMA) with Museo del Palacio de Bellas Artes in Mexico City; exhibited LACMA (December 4, 2016 – May 7, 2017) and Museo del Palacio de Bellas Artes in Mexico City (June 14–September 17, 2017). Catalog edited by Michael Govan and Diana Magaloni ISBN 978-3-791-35555-9
- 2019–2022: Frida Kahlo, Diego Rivera, and Mexican Modernism from the Jacques and Natasha Gelman Collection exhibited at the following:
  - July 6 – September 11, 2022 Philbrook Museum of Art
  - February 19, 2022 – June 5, 2022 Portland Art Museum, Portland, Oregon
  - October 23, 2021 – February 6, 2022 Norton Museum of Art
  - October 25, 2020 – January 25, 2021 Denver Art Museum
  - February 13, 2020 – September 7, 2020 Musée national des beaux-arts du Québec
  - October 12, 2019 – February 2, 2020 North Carolina Museum of Art
  - May 24 – September 2, 2019 Frist Art Museum
- 2020: Vida Americana: Mexican Muralists Remake American Art, 1925–1945, Whitney Museum of American Art, February 17, 2020 – January 31, 2021
- 2021: In Dialogue: Diego Rivera, Hallie Ford Museum of Art, Willamette University, April 9, 2021 – February 17, 2022
- 2022: Diego Rivera's America, co-organized by San Francisco Museum of Modern Art (exhibited July 16, 2022 – January 3, 2023) and Crystal Bridges Museum of American Art, Bentonville, Arkansas (exhibited March 11–July 31, 2023); catalog by James Oles ISBN 978-0-520-34440-2
- 2024: Pan American Unity: A Mural by Diego Rivera, San Francisco Museum of Modern Art, June 28, 2021 – January 21, 2024
- 2025: Rivera's Paris, Arkansas Museum of Fine Arts, Little Rock, Arkansas, February 7 – May 18, 2025
- 2026: Frida and Diego: The Last Dream, Museum of Modern Art, New York, March 18 – September 12, 2026

== See also ==
- List of works by Diego Rivera
- Anahuacalli Museum
- Gabriel Bracho, Venezuelan muralist
- Crystal Cubism
- Elaine Hamilton-O'Neal
- Jewish culture
- Cárcamo de Dolores
- Glorious Victory—Painting of the 1954 Guatemalan coup d'état that the CIA backed to overthrow the democratically elected Guatemalan president Jacobo Arbenz.
- María Izquierdo
