= Jon Paul Phillips =

British actor

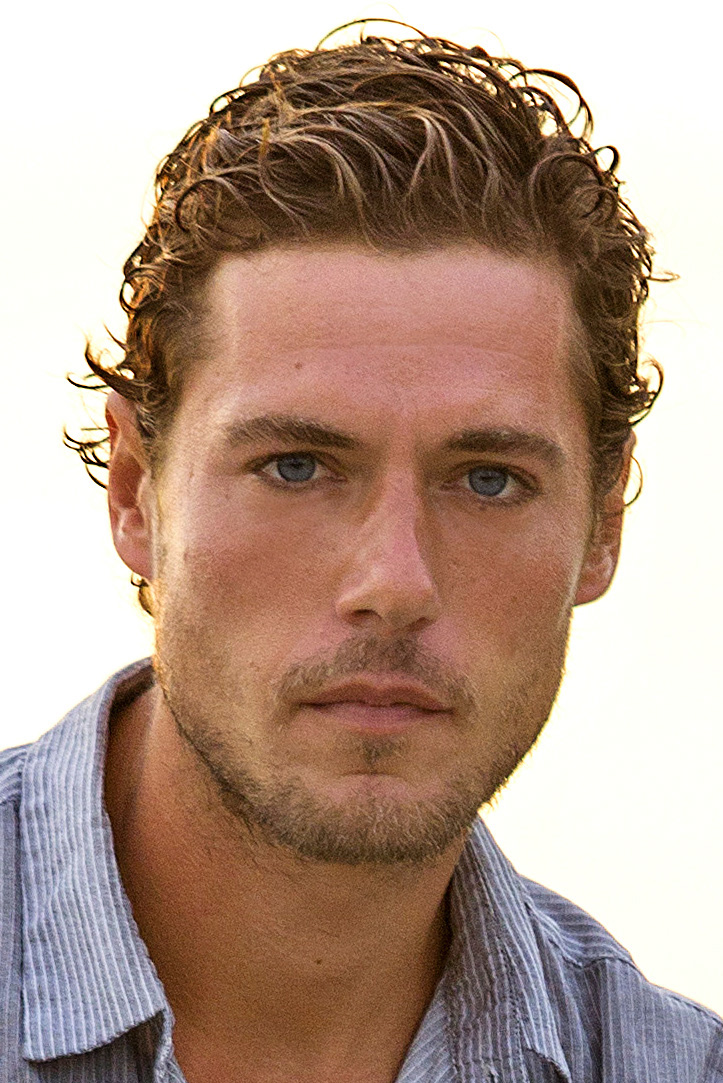
- Phillips at the Austin Film Festival in Austin, Texas
- Born: Jon Paul David Phillips; March 27, 1980 (age 46); Darlington, UK
- Occupations: Actor, Model
- Years active: 2010–present
- Children: 1
- Relatives: Marika Rivera (grandmother); Diego Rivera (great-grandfather); Marie Vorobieff (great-grandmother); Ruth Rivera Marín (half great-aunt)

Jon Paul David Phillips (Darlington, March 27, 1980) is an English actor and model. Born and raised in County Durham in the north of England, he attended the prestigious rugby school Barnard Castle School. He is of English, Russian and Mexican descent and is the great-grandson of Mexican painter Diego Rivera and Russian-born Cubist painter Marie Vorobieff. His grandmother is actress Marika Rivera.

He made his feature debut in a leading role as Jake in the independent film X/Y, directed by Ryan Piers Williams, portraying a flawed but loyal young man who guides his lost friend through the murky waters of his own journey toward self-discovery.

Phillips' previous work includes supporting roles in the films Kilimanjaro, directed by Walter Strafford, and Ass Backwards, directed by Chris Nelson.

Phillips starred alongside Abigail Spencer in a television spot for Audi entitled "Suspect." The commercial aired at the 2012 Emmy Awards, an Audi-sponsored event and introduced the NFL season on NBC.

== Filmography ==
- Kept Boy (2017)
- X/Y (2014)
- Kilimanjaro (2013)
- Ass Backwards (2013)
