= Betsabeé Romero =

Mexican artist (born 1963)

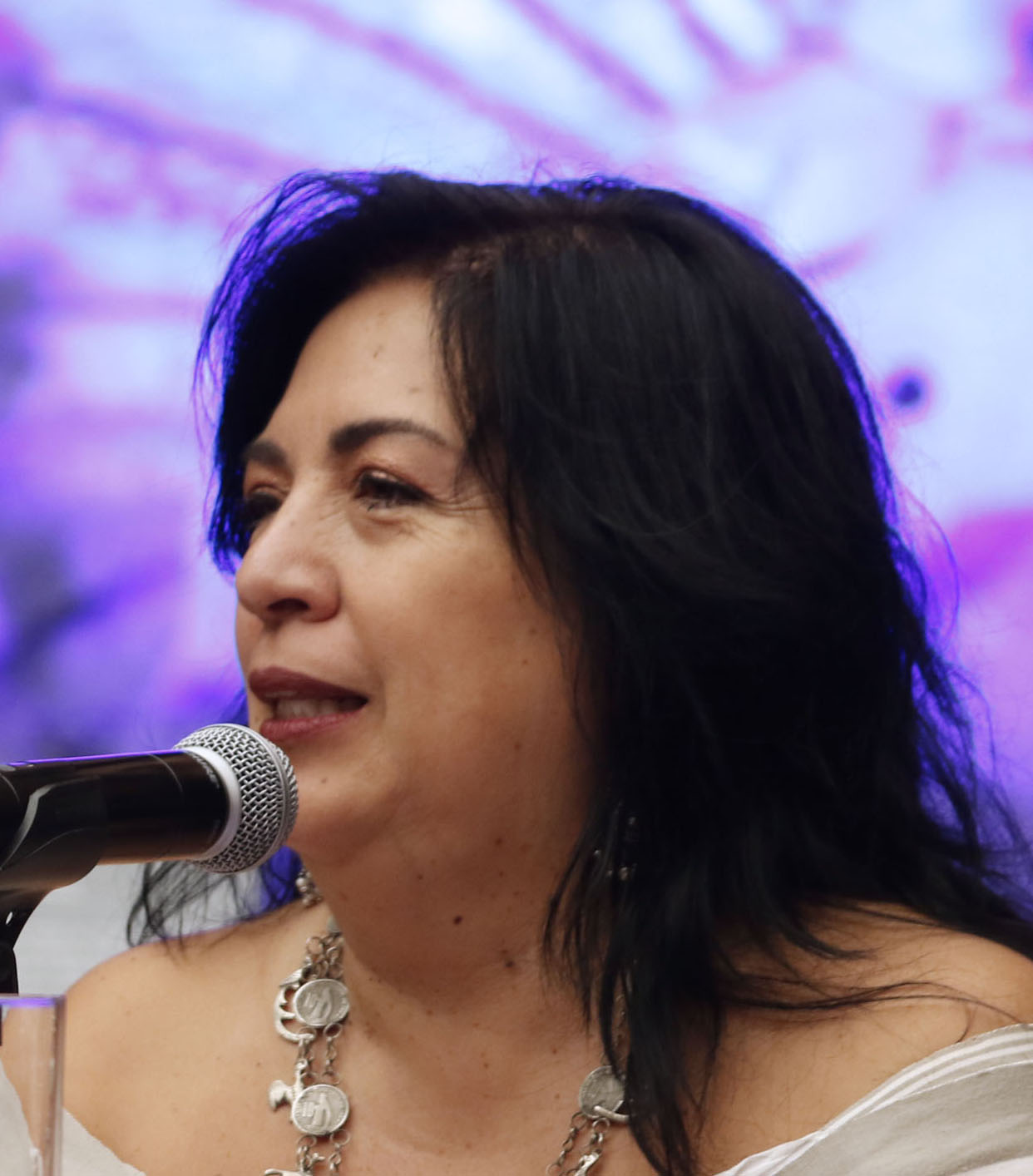
- Betsabeé Romero, 2016
- Born: 1963 (age 62–63); Mexico City, Mexico
- Known for: Visual artist, sculptor
- Website: betsabeeromero.com

External videos
- “Betsabeé Romero creadora de la megaofrenda en el Zócalo”, ADN Opinión, October 31, 2016 (Spanish)
- Betsabeé Romero, Nelson-Atkins Museum of Art, September 17, 2013
- Betsabeé Romero Exhibition at the Neuberger Museum of Art, ArtsWestchester, May 31, 2011
- "Ayate Car: video" (1997), Betsabeé Romero, UC San Diego

Betsabeé Romero (born 1963) is a Mexican visual artist. Her works include sculptures, installations, printmaking, perforated paper, photographs, and videos. She has exhibited widely, and has been featured in more than forty one-person exhibitions in the Americas, Africa, Asia and Europe.

Romero has described herself as a "mechanic artist". She uses everyday materials such as used tires, other car parts, and chewing gum, significant in colonial history and representative of global urban consumption. She combines these with traditional Mexican symbols, images and themes to reflect on history, culture, and the contradictions of modernity.

Her work reflects on issues of social importance such as human migration, gender roles, cultural traditions, religiosity and miscegenation. She grounds her work in the traditions and history of Mexico, but interpretations of her work connect it to contemporary and global contexts.

== Early life and education ==
Betsabeé Romero was born in Mexico City in 1963. She earned her Bachelor of Arts (Licenciatura en Comunicación) at the Universidad Iberoamericana (1980–1984). She earned a Master of Fine Arts degree from Academia de San Carlos in 1986. She also studied at the Louvre and the École nationale supérieure des Beaux-Arts in Paris. After studying in France, she returned to Mexico to study pre-Hispanic and colonial art, earning a second master's degree in Art History from Universidad Nacional Autónoma de México (UNAM) in 1994.

Culture exists where people write, sing, cook or dance. Our culture has been existing and developing on both sides of the border for a long time. Culture is not about borders or walls. Culture can cross a border and continue to live even within a song or within the aroma of a dish.

== Works ==
=== Materials ===
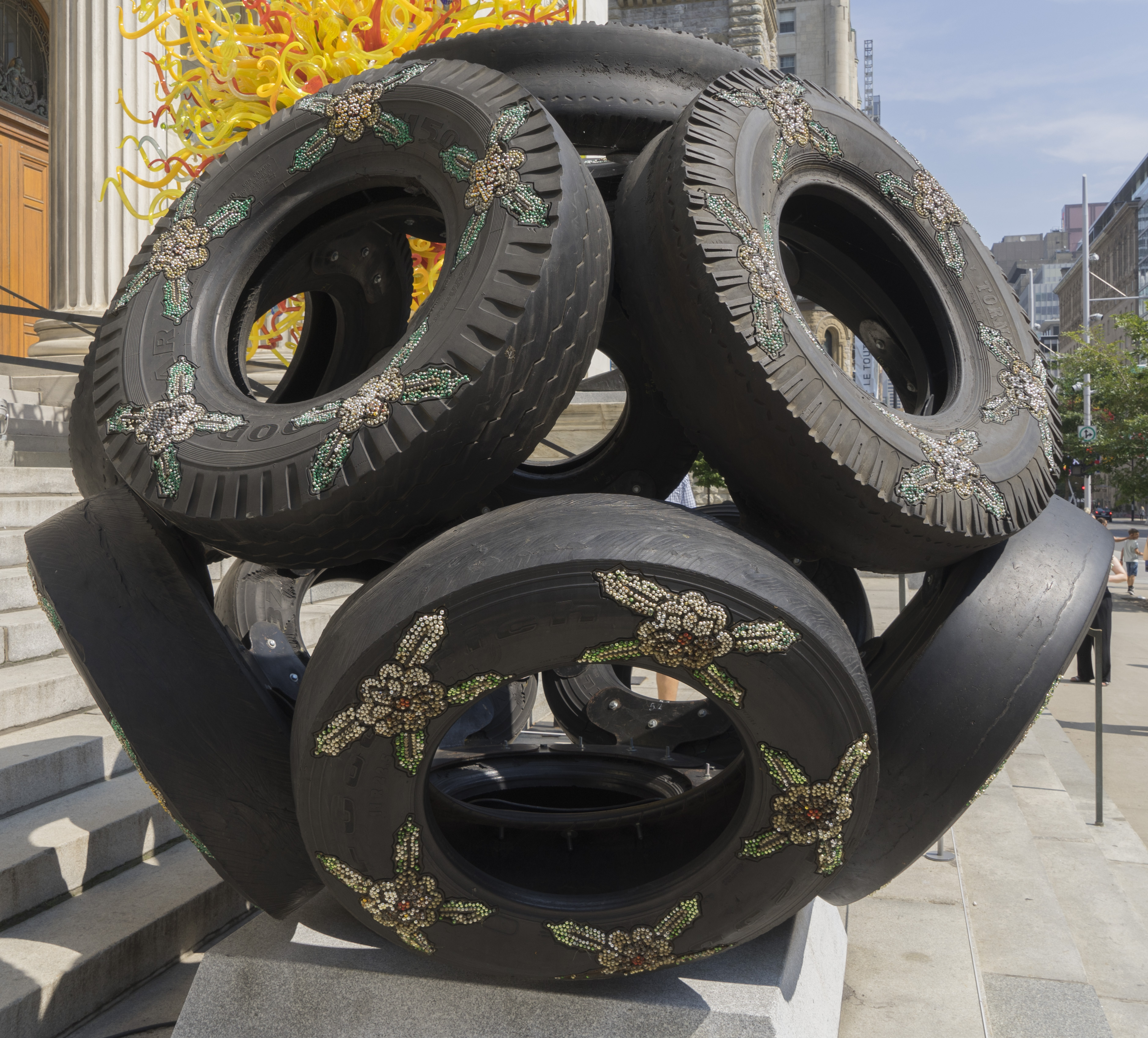
Tribute to Wirikuta, 2011, Montreal, Canada

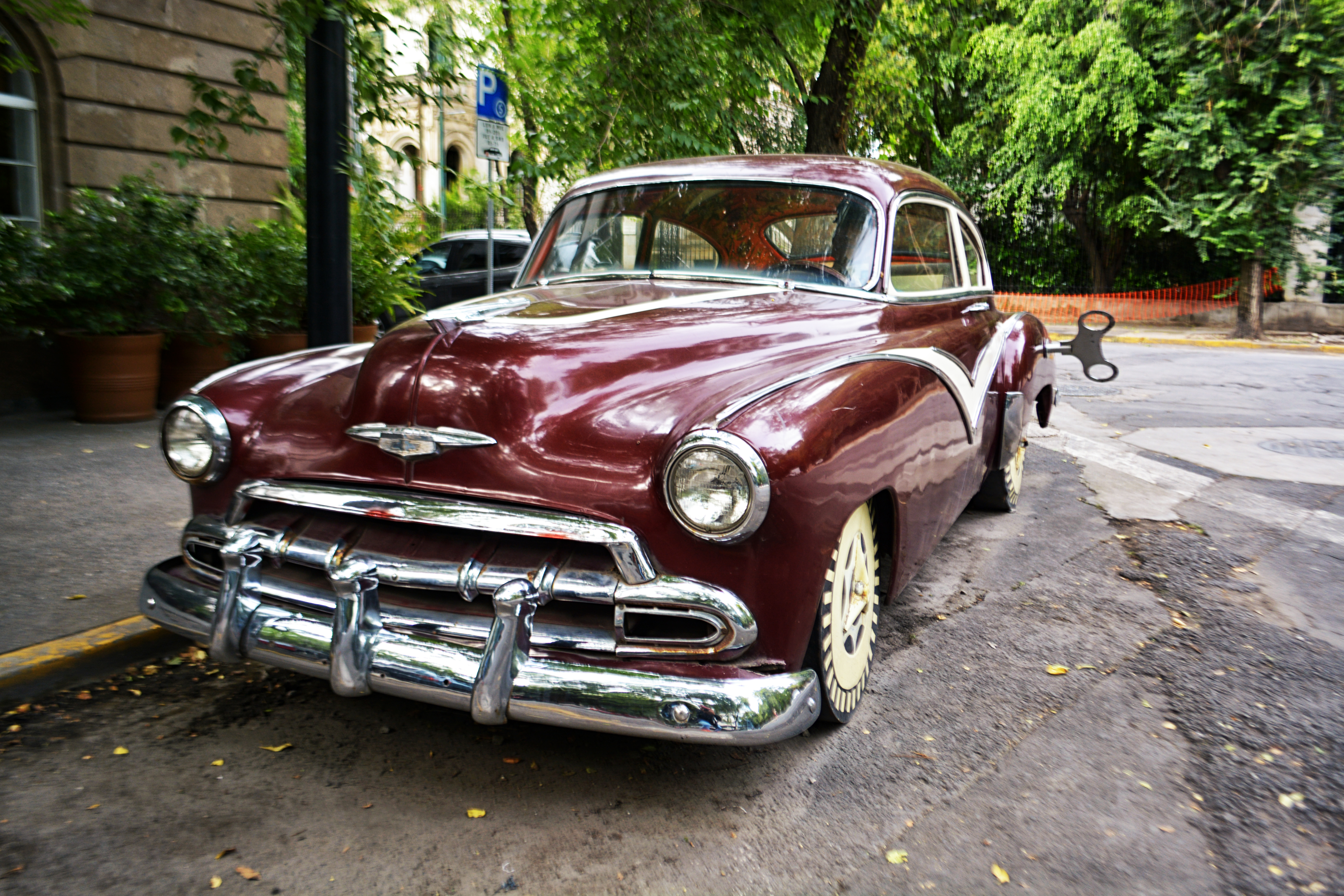
Memoria de Hojalata, Parque España, Mexico City

She intentionally chooses materials that have been used and discarded. Some of her favorite materials are worn-down automobile tires and other car parts. Through sculpture and painting, she transforms these everyday materials to create "refashioned cars, carved tires, painted hoods, and incised mirrors." They are overlaid with images and symbols inspired by Mexican history and culture, ranging from pre-colonial to present times. Tires and cars also serve as symbols of mobility and human migration.

Many of Romero's works combine aspects of sculpture and printmaking, as she pairs modern materials with traditional imagery. She carves textures, patterns, and symbols onto the surface of large discarded tires, treating the rubber as if it were wood. Sometimes she uses the sculpted wheels as giant printmaking rollers to create elaborate textile patterns or tracks in clay.

The materials themselves have significance in a global context, evoking a history of colonialist exploitation as well as recycling and renewal. Natural rubber comes from the milky sap of Hevea brasiliensis, a tree that is indigenous to Brazil and cultivated throughout South America and South-east Asia. In spite of the creation of synthetic rubber, natural rubber still provides about 30 per cent of worldwide rubber production. The history of rubber is complex and difficult, with worldwide social, economic, and political impact. Romero has also used chewing gum as a material, in works such as her suspended tire sculpture, De Tuti fruti. Gum comes from chicle resin, which is extracted from the sapodilla tree of southern Mexico and Central America. Its history dates back to the Mayans and Aztecs.

Through clever inversions of meaning and material, Romero's works question the way in which modern industry appropriates and transforms natural elements such as clay, rubber, and gum for mass production.

=== Exhibitions ===
Betsabeé Romero has participated in more than 20 biennials, including those of Cuba, Brazil, Monterrey, Cairo, and Vancouver, Canada. She has held more than 40 individual exhibitions in Mexico and other countries worldwide. Some of her earliest solo exhibitions were at the Museo de Arte Carrillo Gil (El MACG) in Mexico City (1999), and Sous la grisaille de México, at Espace d'Art Yvonamor Palix in Paris, France (1999).

A ten-year retrospective including 103 pieces of her work, Betsabeé Romero: Lagrimas Negras (Black Tears) was curated by Julián Zugazagoitia and shown at the Museo Amparo in Puebla, Mexico (2007–2008). Versions of this exhibition have also appeared at Antiguo Colegio de San Ildefonso (2010), and the Neuberger Museum of Art (2011).

El Vuelo y Su Semilla (The Flight and Its Seed) examined interplaying themes of migration, colonization, food and traditional culture. It was shown by the Mexican Cultural Institute in Washington, D.C. and San Antonio, Texas` (2017). Each of five rooms featured a different type of work, some accompanied by Romero's poems. Trenzando raíces (Braided roots) at the Art Gallery of York University, Toronto, Ontario (2018) was developed in collaboration with indigenous women from New Credit First Nation. They requested that one of the six pieces created remain at a ceremonial center in Mississauga.

In 2018, Romero was featured as the fourth artist in the National Museum of Women in the Arts-organized New York Avenue Sculpture Project. Four sculptures of carved, painted tires were the first works to be specifically commissioned for the project. They address "themes of migration and movement". Entitled as a group Signals of a Long Road Together, they will be shown for a two-year period on New York Avenue in downtown Washington, D.C. Used car tires are carved, painted with metallic paint, and assembled into "totemic structures" that use interior lighting to increase visibility. Huellas y cicatricez (Traces and scars) is a 16-foot stack of four tires, carved with figures of running mothers and children, hand in hand. Movilidad y tensión (Mobility and tension) stacks eight-halves of tires, engraved with a blend of Islamic and European designs reminiscent of Mudéjar symbols from ancient Spain. In En cautiverio (In captivity) slender steel columns hold up two tractor tires, whose surfaces are painted with intertwining serpents. Movilidad en suspenso (Mobility in suspense) is an assembly of four tractor tires whose treads are decorated with traditional Mexican patterns.

Romero has taken part in numerous collective exhibitions and her works are part of permanent collections worldwide, including the Daros Latinamerica Collection, Zurich, Switzerland; the Jacques and Natasha Gelman Collection; Los Angeles County Museum of Art (LACMA); the Nelson-Atkins Museum of Art in Kansas City, Missouri, and the Phoenix Art Museum.

=== Day of the Dead installations ===
Betsabeé Romero has created a number of installations focused around the Day of the Dead. The Day of the Dead is a holiday that takes place in Mexico and Central America on November 1 and 2 as a commemoration of the deceased. Its origins go back 3000 years, and reflect a fusion of pre-Hispanic culture and Catholic religion.

In 2015 Romero created an installation for the Day of the Dead at the British Museum. In the Great Court, she created an altar dedicated to the Unknown Immigrant. She drew upon folk traditions of paper and metal art, creating cantolla hot air balloons shaped like skulls out of tissue paper and tin calacas skeletons to float above the Great Court. Hanging paper banners printed on papel picado were placed in the Round Reading room, and marigold serpents wound their way up the stairs.

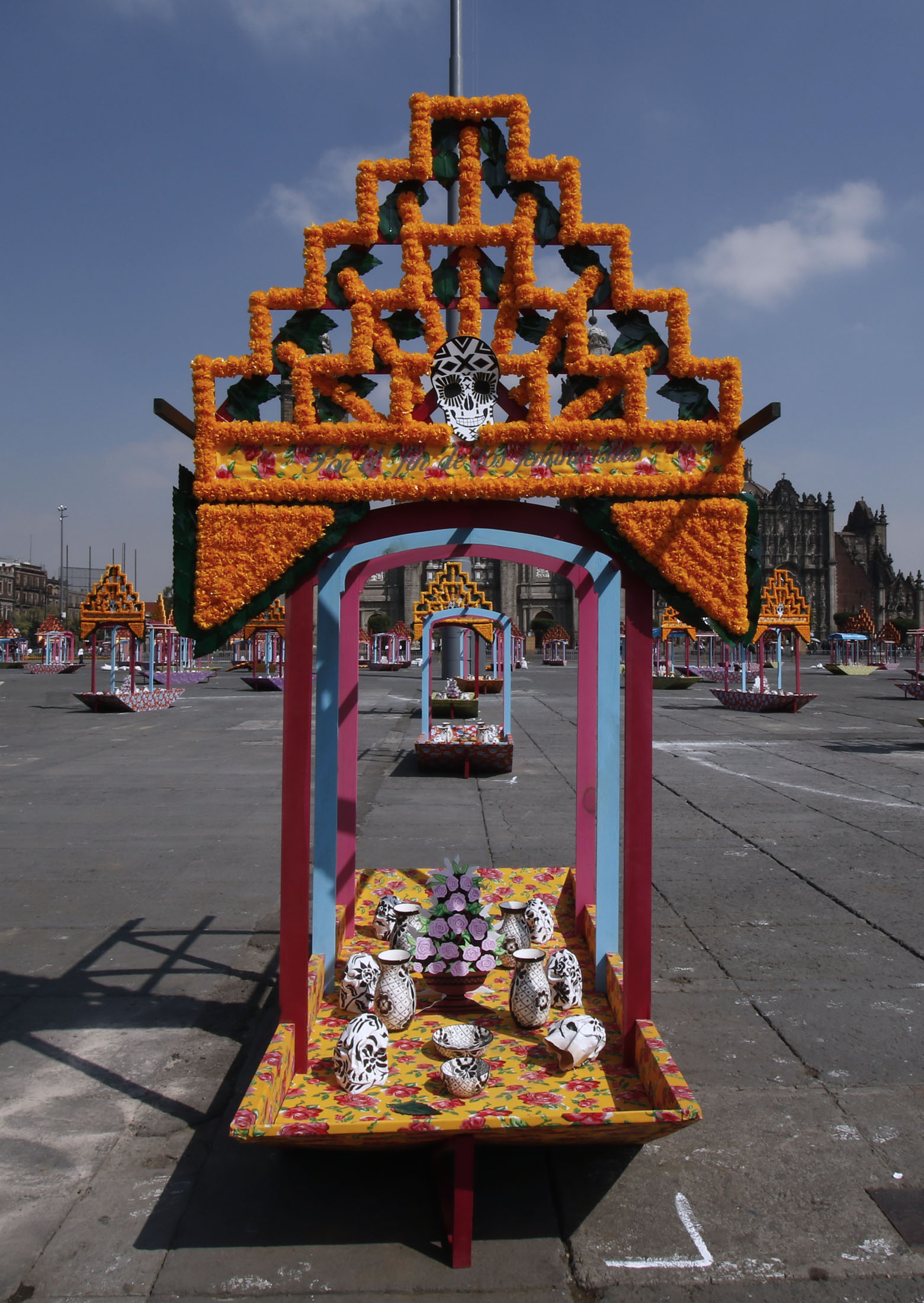
One of the 103 trajineras in Canto de Agua, Martínez / Secretaría de Cultura CDMX

Betsabeé Romero's installation Canto de Agua (Song of water) was held in the Zócalo of Mexico City (2016), and opened by the mayor of Mexico City, Miguel Ángel Mancera. The installation combined the cultural traditions of the Day of the Dead ofrenda or offering; the trajinera, a traditional type of flat-bottomed boat; and the social concerns of the present. 103 trajineras were decorated as offerings to commemorate those who had died during the year and to connect their deaths to social conditions and problems of Mexico City. The trajineras were created by Mexican artisans from Ciudad Nezahualcóyotl and reflect traditions of pre-Hispanic times in which trajineras circulated in Tenochtitlán.

Los huesos tienen memoria (Bones have a memory) at the Museo Dolores Olmedo (2016–2017) was dedicated to the almost 28 thousand missing persons registered by the Mexican federal government. Romero incorporated modern elements inspired by the lamps Dolores Olmedo made of Bohemian glass for her home. Romero used flaked wax and tin and sugar skulls to create lights, which she sees as representing the light of living traditions that illuminate society. Fabric banners were reminiscent of pre-Hispanic codices like the Codex Borgia. Arrays of sugar skulls recall Mesoamerican skull racks or Tzompantli where the skulls of sacrifices were exhibited.

== Awards and honors ==
Betsabeé Romero has been the recipient of numerous awards and honors, including the following:

- 1988, Oric'Art, Neuilly sur Seine, France
- 1994, Jóvenes Creadores de Conaculta (scholarship for young creators), CONACULTA
- 1994, Grand Prize, Acquisition Award in the II FEMSA Biennial, Mexico, for Refugio para un lecho de rosas (Shelter for a bed of roses)
- 2006, first prize, Cairo Biennial, for Cuerpos vestidos (Dressed Bodies)
