= Jason Michael Berman =

American film producer and executive

- Born: Baltimore, Maryland, United States
- Education: USC School of Cinematic Arts
- Occupations: Studio executive, film producer
- Years active: 2004—present

Jason Michael Berman is an American film producer and executive. He serves as the President and Founder of A/Vantage Pictures and previously served as the President of Mandalay Pictures, where he is responsible for developing and structuring financing for Mandalay's slate of independent films, in addition to packaging projects.

== Biography ==
Jason Michael Berman is the Founder and President of A/Vantage Pictures, a production company with offices in Los Angeles, New York, and Boulder. Launched in 2025 following Berman’s decade-long tenure as President of Mandalay Pictures, A/Vantage was built to develop and produce elevated, commercially driven films rooted in culturally resonant storytelling and bold, director-led vision.

Currently, Berman is gearing up for A/Vantage’s debut feature Highest 2 Lowest, a contemporary reimagining of Akira Kurosawa’s High and Low directed by Spike Lee and starring Denzel Washington, Jeffrey Wright, and Ilfenesh Hadera. The film will have its world premiere at the 2025 Cannes Film Festival and be released theatrically by A24 in August, followed by a global streaming launch on Apple TV+. The company is also in post production on Rock Springs, a psychological thriller written and directed by Vera Miao, starring Benedict Wong, Kelly Marie Tran, and Jimmy O. Yang.

Prior to founding A/Vantage, Berman produced a wide range of acclaimed and high-profile films, including Air (Amazon Studios), directed by Ben Affleck and starring Matt Damon, Viola Davis, and Jason Bateman; Surrounded (MGM), starring Letitia Wright; and Nine Days (Sony Pictures Classics). He also produced The Birth of a Nation, which won both the Grand Jury Prize and Audience Award at the Sundance Film Festival, alongside additional credits such as Burning Sands, Uncorked, IO, Juanita, and Little Evil.

Recognized in Variety’s Dealmakers Impact Report and "Top Ten Producers to Watch," Berman is a member of the Academy of Motion Picture Arts and Sciences. He also played a founding role in the Sundance Institute Catalyst program, which has raised over $60 million for independent filmmakers. Since 2013, he has served as an adjunct professor at the USC School of Cinematic Arts, where he earned his degree.

A native of Baltimore, Maryland, Berman began his career at the William Morris Agency and MGM Studios, and has collaborated closely with Oscar-nominated writer-director Gary Ross.

== Filmography ==
Producer

- Rift (2004) (Short film)
- The Tao of Pong (2004) (Short film)
- Racer Number 9 (2005) (Short film)
- Outside a Dream (2005) (Short film)
- Muertas (2007) (Short film)
- The Dry Land (2010) (Co-producer)
- Seven Days in Utopia (2011)
- Brooklyn Brothers Beat the Best (2011)
- LUV (2012)
- The Most Fun I've Ever Had with My Pants On (2012)
- Kilimanjaro (2013)
- Little Accidents (2014)
- Chu and Blossom (2014)
- X/Y (2014)
- The Benefactor (2015)
- Mediterranea (2015)
- Julianne (2016) (Short film)
- The Birth of a Nation (2016)
- Approaching the Unknown (2016)
- Burning Sands (2017)
- Little Evil (2017)
- Amateur (2018)
- Little Con Lili (2018) (Short film)
- IO (2019)
- Juanita (2019)
- Otherhood (2019)
- Nine Days (2020)
- Uncorked (2020)
- The Last Days of American Crime (2020)
- The 90 Day Plan (2021) (Associate producer)
- Monopoly Game (2021) (Short film)
- Air (2023)
- Surrounded (2023)
- The Yellow (2024) (Short film)
- Barron's Cove (2024)
- Highest 2 Lowest (2025)
- Rock Springs (2026)
- They Fight (2026)
- Shucked (TBA)

Executive Producer

Year	Title	Notes
2008	Dead on Thursday	Short film
2011	Jess + Moss	
2012	Struck by Lightning	
2014	Loitering with Intent	
2015	The Bridge Partner	Short film
2015	Monsters	Short film
2016	Cat	Short film
2018	Beast	
2019	Lavender	Short film
2020	Dirty	Short film
2020	See You Soon	Short film
2020	Repo	Short film
2021	Grave Intentions	segment: "The Bridge Partner"
2022	Soul of a Man	Short film
2022	Pulm Town	Short film
2023	Bolt From the Blue	

== Distinctions ==
- 2011: Top Ten Producers to Watch by Variety
- 2012: Top Ten Producers to Watch at Sundance by Deadline Hollywood
