= Marie Vorobieff =

Russian painter (1892–1984)

- Мария Брониславовна Воробьёва-Стебельская
- Born: Maria Bronislavovna Vorobyova-Stebelskaya; 14 February [O.S. 2 February] 1892; Cheboksary, Russian Empire
- Died: 4 May 1984 (aged 92); London, England
- Education: Stroganov Art Academy
- Style: Cubism, Pointillism

Maria Bronislavovna Vorobyeva-Stebelska (Russian: Мария Брониславовна Воробьёва-Стебельская; Maria Bronislavovna Vorobyova-Stebelskaya; (14 February [O.S. 2 February] 1892 – 4 May 1984), also known as "Marie Vorobieff" or Marevna, was a 20th-century Russian-born painter known for her work with Cubism and pointillism.

She is internationally known for convincingly combining elements of cubism (called by her "Dimensionalism") with pointillism and – through the use of the Golden Ratio for laying out paintings – structure. She has been accredited with being the first female cubist painter. Though she lived the greater part of her life abroad – her formative years as a cubist painter in France and her mature years in England – she is often referred to as a "Russian painter".

From her relationship with the Mexican cubist painter and later muralist Diego Rivera in Paris she had a daughter, Marika Rivera (1919-2010), who became a professional dancer and film actress.

== Artist's name ==
Marevna was also known, depending on the preferred usage or transliteration, as Maria Marevna, Marie Marevna, Marie Vorobiev, Maria Vorobieva, Marie Vorobieff Marevna, Maria Marewna Worobiew, Marevna Vorobëv, Marevna Vorobyev, Marevna Vorobieva, Marevna Vorobev-Stebelska, Marevna Vorobyov-Stebelska, Maria Vorobyova-Stebelskaya, Maria Bronislawowna Worobjewa-Stebelskaja, Maria Bronislavovna, Maria Rozanowicz-Vorobieff, and Rosanovitch Marevna Vorobiev.

Reputedly, the nickname Marevna was given to her by Maxim Gorky after a Russian fairy sea princess. In his autobiography, Diego Rivera spells her name "Marievna".

== Growing up in Russia ==
Marevna reputedly was born in 1892 in Cheboksary in the administrative district of Kazan in Russia as Maria Bronislavovna Vorobyova-Stebelskaya to the Polish nobleman Bronisław Stebelski and the Russian actress Maria Vorobyova (née Rosanovich), the wife of Alexander Vorobyov. She spent a lonely childhood in Tiflis, now Tbilisi, the capital of Georgia, then under Russian control. In 1910 she went to Moscow to study at the Stroganov Art Academy, but in the following year left for Italy. On the island of Capri she was introduced to Maxim Gorky who named her after a Russian fairy sea princess, Marevna, a name she adopted and made her own. A petite blue-eyed blonde, she was said not to have been a conventional beauty; but an outgoing nature paired with the proverbial depth of the Russian soul seems to have given her a special charm that easily elicited an enthusiastic echo from her contemporaries.

== Early career in Paris ==
In 1912, as a twenty-year-old budding talent, Marevna moved to Paris, where she continued her art studies and soon began displaying her work at exhibitions. She became acquainted and, indeed, friends with some of the greatest artists and writers of the early twentieth century then resident in Montparnasse and especially at La Ruche. Among them were Georges Braque, Marc Chagall, Jean Cocteau, Ilya Ehrenburg, Maxim Gorki, Max Jacob, Moise Kisling, Pinchus Krémègne, Fernand Léger, Henri Matisse, Amedeo Modigliani, Pablo Picasso, and Chaïm Soutine.

Three years later, in 1915, the gifted Mexican painter Diego Rivera, also temporarily resident in Paris at La Ruche – no Adonis but a known womanizer of violent temper – began a relationship with her while he was still in a common-law marriage with the Russian artist Angelina Beloff, six years his senior and then pregnant with his only son Diego Jr., who was not, however, to survive for more than 14 months. In his autobiography, Rivera tells the following story:

As I was leaving her hotel room, intending to return to Angelina, Marievna embraced me. A knife was hidden in her sleeve, and as I kissed her for the last time, she carved a wide gash in the back of my neck.... As I lay on the floor unconscious, Marievna cut her throat. Neither of us died, however.

According to Rivera, "[a]bout six months after I had resumed living with Angeline, Marievna began taking a stand before the door of our house.... She was pregnant and she was accusing me of deserting her with child.... Even if, by barest chance, I was really her [Marika's] father, neither she nor Marievna ever actually needed me". Marika was born in Paris on 13 November 1919.

Diego Rivera at the time was at the zenith of his cubist phase, having already exhibited his works at three exhibitions. Marevna herself discovered cubism as an eminently suited vehicle for her own talent and is thought to have been one of the first female cubist painters. A comparison of Marevna's and Rivera's subsequent work, and also of Marevna's paintings with those of Rivera's later wife Frida Kahlo, suggests that Marevna never quite lost sight of him. Nevertheless, for a time, until his tragic death, she was to find a kindred spirit in Chaïm Soutine.

"Homage to Friends from Montparnasse" (1962), of mural size yet painted long after she had left Paris, is a window into Marevna's heart, not only as regards Diego Rivera, but also Chaïm Soutine and other Paris friends – a little circle completely dominated by Amedeo Modigliani.

== Later career in England ==
Marevna's and Diego Rivera's daughter Marika became first a dancer, then a film actress, and then also a playwright, using the name Marika Rivera. At her first wedding in 1938, Marika married the Provence painter Jean Paul Brusset, by whom she had a son, Jean Brusset. Subsequently, she married the owner of the literary periodical "Polemic", Rodney Phillips, who for the duration of their marriage owned Athelhampton House in Dorset, England (1949–1957), and by whom in 1949 she had her second son, David Phillips.

Marevna lived with her daughter's family at Athelhampton. Her paintings from this time include a portrait of its owner – her son-in-law Rodney Phillips – and the stunning topiaries in its Great Court ("Pyramid Garden").

After the break-up of her daughter's second marriage, mother, daughter and the two grandsons moved to a significantly smaller though still sizeable property in Ealing, "the queen of the London suburbs", a few steps down the road from Ealing Abbey, a Roman Catholic Benedictine monastery and parish church. In Ealing Marevna "enjoyed some three more fruitful decades before her demise there in 1984". This was to gloss over the low points in the early 1960s. The Pushkin Club for Russian exiles in London arranged an exhibition of her paintings but the poor lighting and hanging made for a disaster and even at the rock bottom price of $60 there were no sales. In the Christmas Bazaar sale the club sold off her small watercolors for not more than $3. At home the household dogs had access to her storage and damaged her paintings. No money was available from her family for paint or materials nor was there even a room to paint in. She was fortunate enough then to meet Anya Teixeira at the Club. The latter bought her materials from her meager earnings as a clerk. These included the rolls of canvas from which the ultra-large pictures of her former colleagues in the Russian School of Paris painted. She successfully pleaded for Marevna to have the use of a large room to paint in so she could resume her career.

Marevna died in London on 4 May 1984.

== Select list of paintings ==
While unfortunately the contract for the work ended in court proceedings, the catalogue and online reproductions of over 100 pictures are available (for reference only) on the official site of Anya Teixeira for the years up till 1967. These slides undoubtedly helped the subsequent purchase of much of Marevna's work by Oscar Ghez, the Swiss collector.

This catalogue and the slides have been digitized and are held for research purposes by the Women's Art Library, a branch of Goldsmiths College, London.

A significant number of her paintings were collected by the Cooke family while they lived at Athelhampton house, and were sold in a public auction by Dukes Auction house, Dorchester, held at the house in October 2019. A list of the paintings sold is available at https://app.dukes-auctions.com/en/auction/992-athelhampton-house-an-auction-on-the-premises?page=15

=== 1910s ===
- 1913 – Georgian Dance (probably a self-portrait)
- 1915 – Still Life (gouache, 20 cm x 16 cm)
- 1916 – Diego Rivera, Amedeo Modigliani and Ilya Ehrenburg in Rivera's studio (drawing)
- 1916 – L'attente (c.1916, oil, 39 cm x 28 cm)
- 1916 – M. et Mme. Zetlin, La Rotonde Café, Paris (signed, 1916, 21.5 cm x 16.5 cm)
- 1916-1917 – Chaïm Soutine (portrait, c.1916-17, canvas)
- 1917 – La Rotonde Terasza, Paris
- 1917 – Nature morte à la bouteille (oil/canvas, 50 cm x 61 cm)
- 1917 – Self Portrait with Still Life (72 cm x 54 cm)
- 1918 – Nature morte aux deux orange (aquarelle/paper, 43 cm x 57 cm)

=== 1920s ===
- 1927 – Adolescente, Portrait of a Young Girl (oil/panel, 6 cm x 38 cm)
- 1927 – Portrait de Marika (oil/panel, 40 cm x 32 cm)
- 1929 – Femme allongée (painting, 21 cm x 30 cm)

=== 1930s ===
- 1930 – Femme nue, en buste (1930, oil, 55 cm x 46 cn)
- 1930 – Standing Nude (c. 1930, watercolour, 39 cm x 28.5 cm)
- 1930 – Deux amies (c. 1930, mine plomb, 44 cm x 63 cm)
- 1931 – Portrait de Monsieur Zamaron (1931, oil, 46.5 cm x 38 cm)
- 1931 – Bouquet de fleurs (1931, oil, 60 cm x 43 cm)
- 1931 – Still Life with Flowers and Fruits in a Basket (1931, oil/canvas, 80.5 cm x 60.5 cm)
- 1932 – Vase de fleurs des champs (1932, oil/canvas, 55 cm x 38.5 cm)
- 1932 – Composition de fleurs des champs (1932, oil, 55 cm x 38 cm)
- 1936 – Cagne (1936, oil/panel, 52 cm x 71 cm)
- 1938 – Vase de fleurs (1938, oil, 65 cm x 50 cm)
- 1939 – Le petit marin (1939, mine plomb, 62 cm x 47 cm)
- 1939 –Le matelot au café (1939, colour pencils/paper, 63 cm x 47 cm)
- 1939 –Reclining Nude (1939, watercolour, 23.5 cm x 32 cm)
- 1939-1942 –Nue allongée (1939–1942, watercolour, 23.5 cm x 32 cm)

=== 1940s ===
- 1940 – Cagnes-sur-Mer (1940, mixed media, 28 cm x 38 cm)
- 1940 – Portrait de Femme (1940)
- 1942 – Portrait of Marika with shawl (1942, watercolour/paper, 31 cm x 24.5 cm)
- 1942 – Frère et soeur (1942, ink, 27.5 cm x 21.5 cm)
- 1942 – Mère et ses deux enfants (1942, oil, 115 cm x 81 cm)
- 1942 – Two children (1942, oil/canvas, 35 cm x 24 cm)
- 1942 – Saint-Paul-de-Vence, bouquet à la colombe d’or (1942, oil, 92 cm x 65 cm)
- 1942 – Vase with Anemones (1942, oil/canvas, 72 cm x 58.5 cm) (scroll down to 11th painting)
- 1942 – Nude in a landscape (1942, oil/canvas, 55 cm x 42 cm)
- 1942 – Mother and Child (1942, oil/canvas, 141 x 81 cm)
- 1943 – Composition aux raisins et aux pommes (1943, oil, 54 cm x 48 cm)
- 1943 – Mère et enfants (1943, oil, 100 cm x 81 cm)
- 1943 – Belle Arménienne (1943, oil, 73 cm x 60 cm)
- 1943 – Two seated nudes (1943, watercolour, 53 cm x 40 cm)
- 1944 – Femme assise (1944, watercolour, gouache, 33 cm x 25 cm)
- 1944 – Vase of Tulips (1944, oil/canvas, 73 cm x 54 cm)
- 1945 – Portrait of Two girls (1945, Pencil and watercolour on paper laid on board, 64 cm х 95 cm)
- 1946 – Bouquet de Fleurs (signed, 1946, 37.5 cm x 31 cm)
- 1946 – Jeune femme au chapeau (1946, oil, 65 cm x 50 cm)
- 1946 – Landscape with Trees and Barrow (1946, oil/canvas/board, 48.9 cm x 73.6 cm)
- 1948 – Nature morte à la bouteille (c.1948, oil/canvas, 51 cm x 61 cm)

=== 1950s ===
- 1953 – Nature morte au panier de raisins (1953, oil/board, 64 cm x 51 cm)
- 1953 – The Squirrel (1953, watercolour/pencil/paper, 46.5 cm x 56.3 cm)
- 1955 – Portrait of David, the artist's grandson, aged 6 (1955, signed, oil/canvas, 87 cm x 66 cm)
- 1956 – Untitled (1956, signed, drawing/watercolour, 25 cm x 35 cm)
- 1956 – Saint Benedict at prayer near Monte Cassino (1956, signed)
- 1956 – Still-life with fish and bottle (1956, mixed media on canvas, 57 cm х 44 cm)
- 1959 – Ealing Abbey (1959, signed)
- 1959-1966 – Cubist Still Life with Flowers (1959–66, oil/board, 100 cm x 60 cm)

=== 1960s ===
- 1960 – Nature morte au violon (c.1960, signed, oil, 57.5 cm x 40.5 cm)
- 1962 – Homage to Friends from Montparnasse (c.1962, oil/canvas) featuring the images of (from top left to right): Diego Rivera, Ilya Ehrenburg, Chaïm Soutine, Amedeo Modigliani and his common-law wife Jeanne Hébuterne, Max Jacob, galerie owner Leopold Zborowski and (bottom left to right): Marevna, with young daughter Marika and Moïse Kisling.
- 1966 – Sleeping Girl in green (1966, oil/panel, 48.2 cm x 60.5 cm)
- 1966 – The Harbour. Amsterdam (1966, plywood/oil, 61 cm х 123 cm)
- 1967 – Dancing Jews/Rabbis/Chasidics (1967, ink, pen, 22.5 cm x 29 cm)
- 1967 – Fillette au bouquet (c.1967, oil, 75.5 cm x 50.5 cm)
- 1968 – Portrait of Marika with her Dog and Cats (1968, oil/panel, 89 cm x 122 cm)
- 1968 – Chat pres d'un vase de fleurs (1968, oil/canvas, 86 cm x 64 cm)
- 1968 – Sous-bois a Vence (1968, oil/canvas, 73 cm x 92 cm)
- 1969 – Landscape with a Thistle (signed, 1969, oil/canvas, 96 cm x 130 cm)
- 1969 – Gamblers (1969, oil/canvas, 90 cm х 130 cm)

=== 1970s ===
- 1970 – Dancing Jews/Rabbis/Chasidics (1970, signed and dated, oil/canvas, framed and glazed, 127 cm x 152 cm)
- 1972 – Reclining Beauty with Boots (Catherine/Cate Dolan) (1972, oil/canvas, 50.8 cm x 76.2 cm)
- 1972 – The Bathers, After Cézanne (1972, signed in Latin l.l., oil/canvas, 39.4 cm x 48.2 cm)
- 1972 – Portrait de Colin Phillips (1972, oil/canvas, 91 cm x 71 cm)
- 1972 – Family (1972, oil/canvas, 127 cm х 174 cm)
- 1973 – Seated Woman with Madonna and Child (1973, signed in Latin l.l., oil/pencil/canvas/board, 83.6 cm x 58.6 cm)
- 1974 – Reclining Woman with two Dogs (1974, oil/board, 108 cm x 117 cm)
- 1976 – Nude before a Mirror (1976, watercolour, pencil/paper, 58 cm x 41 cm)
- 1978 – Portrait of Marika (1978, oil/canvas, 65.5 cm x 51.5 cm)
- 1979 – The artist's house, Ealing (1979, oil, 49.5 cm x 60 cm)

=== Dates unknown ===
- Smokers: Ballet owner Serge de Diaghilev (centre) with Jean Cocteau (to his left), Natalia Goncharova (left) and her husband Mikhail Larionov (right) (scroll down to 3rd painting), for detail see:
- Le cuisinier (watercolour, 98 cm x 66 cm)
- Nature morte aux raisins (aquarelle/paper, 63 cm x 48 cm)
- Paysage (Gouache/papier, 36 cm x 49 cm)
- Tournesols (oil/canvas, 58 cm x 91 cm)
- Jeune fille au chat (oilcanvas, 51 cm x 41 cm)
- Femme nue debout (watercolour, 38 cm x 28 cm)
- Portrait de femme brune (oil, 49 cm x 36 cm)
- Portrait de Jeannot (oil/canvas/board, 36 cm x 24 cm)
- Les deux amies (oil, 81 cm x 65.5 cm)
- Jeune enfant avec une grappe de raisins (oil, 54 cm x 47 cm)
- Les Mabinogion (illustration for book cover)
- Village in a Hilly Landscape (watercolour, 25 cm x 33.5 cm)
- Landshap te Almelo, gezien vanuit een raam (unsigned, 61.5 cm x 38 cm) (go down to painting No. 2206, or see enlargement without description)
- Descent from the Cross (oil/canvas, 186 cm x 312 cm)
- Dom Bernard with Bible
- Cubist Sunflowers (oil/canvas, 109.2 cm x 76.2 cm)
- Man and a Bird (indistinctly dated, signed, oil/canvas, 71 cm x 63 cm)
- Nude (signed, mixed media on paper, 44 cm x 63 cm)
- Mother and Child (ink/paper, 37 cm x 25 cm)
- Girl with Flowers (oil/canvas, 76 cm x 51 cm)
- A seated Man (watercolour/paper, 30 cm x 21.5 cm)

== Publications ==
- Marevna Vorobëv, Life in Two Worlds: A True Chronicle of the Origins of Montparnasse (London 1962)
- Marevna Vorobëv, Life with the Painters of La Ruche (Publisher: Constable 1972, ISBN 0-09-458760-4; American edition: New York 1974; 3rd edition, David Phillips 2007)
- Marevna Vorobëv, Mémoires d'une nomade (Publisher: Encre 1979, ISBN 2-86418-024-3)
- Marevna Vorobëv, Marevna et les Montparnos: Au Musée Bourdelle, ville de Paris, du 25 septembre au 3 novembre 1985 (Publisher: Musées de la ville de Paris 1985, ISBN 2-901784-06-2)
- Gill Perry, Women artists and the Parisian avant-garde: Modernism and 'feminine' art, 1900 to the late 1920s (Manchester University Press 1995)
