= Marika Rivera =

French actress (1919–2010)

- Born: 13 November 1919; Paris, France
- Died: 14 January 2010 (aged 90); Charlton Down, Dorset, England
- Spouses: Jean Paul Brusset (m. 1938; div. 1945) Rodney Phillips (m. 1949; div. 1957)
- Children: 2
- Parent(s): Marie Vorobieff; Diego Rivera
- Relatives: Ruth Rivera Marín (half-sister); Jon Paul Phillips (grandson)

Marika Rivera (13 November 1919 – 14 January 2010) was a French-born film and stage actress and dancer.

== Biography ==
Rivera was born in Paris, France, the daughter of the Mexican artist Diego Rivera and his mistress, the Russian-born painter Marie Vorobieff ("Marevna"). Rivera, who was married to Angelina Beloff at the time, did not accept his daughter, so she grew up under the care of her mother. Rivera participated in dancing and acting classes from an early age; from the age of 3 she was taught dancing by Isadora Duncan. She started performing as a dancer at age 5.

In 1938 Rivera married the painter Jean Paul Brusset, and gave birth to their son Jean Brusset in 1941. Later she was married from 1949 to 1957 to Rodney Phillips, who was the owner of the Athelhampton House, Dorset. In Dorset she bore her second son David Phillips in 1949. David is the father of actor Jon Paul Phillips. After her second divorce she lived in Ealing in Greater London, England.

Rivera died on 14 January 2010 at age 90, survived by her two sons.

Rivera's film credits included roles in Darling (1965), The Girl on a Motorcycle (1968), Fiddler on the Roof (1971), Percy's Progress (1974), Fellini's Casanova (1976), Voyage of the Damned (1976), Hussy (1980), The Supergrass (1985), Hôtel du Paradis (1986) and Eat the Rich (1987).

== Filmography ==
Year	Title	Role	Notes
1965	Darling	Woman	
1968	The Girl on a Motorcycle	German Waitress	
1971	Fiddler on the Roof	Rifka	
1974	Percy's Progress	Madame Lopez	
1976	Fellini's Casanova	Astrodi	Uncredited
1976	Voyage of the Damned	Madame in Bordello	
1976	Hussy	French Singer	
1985	The Supergrass	Bed and Breakfast Landlady	
1986	Hôtel du Paradis	Marika	
1987	Eat the Rich	Marika	
1987	Vincent		(final film role)
