= Museo Dolores Olmedo =

Mexican art museum

Dolores Olmedo Museum
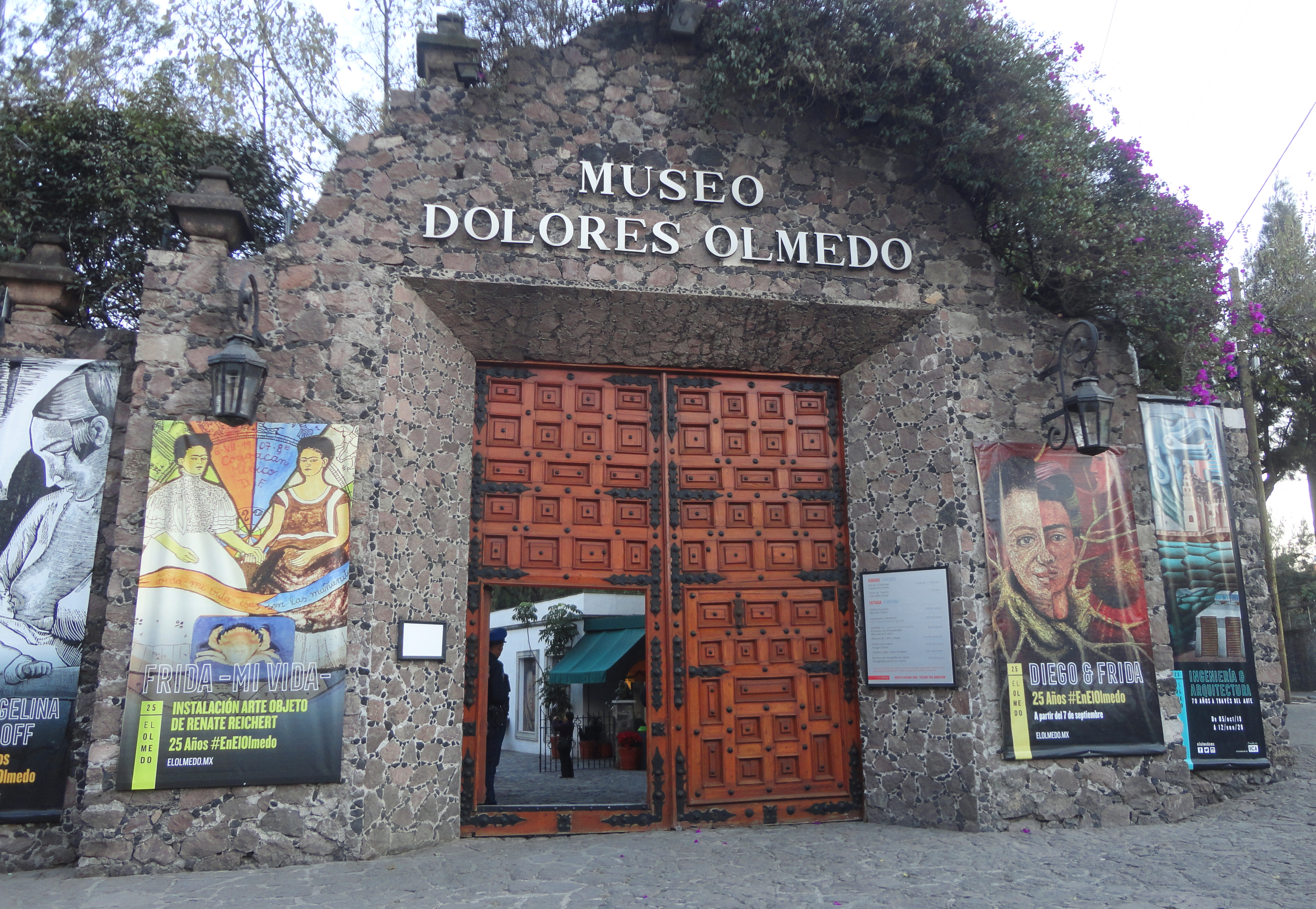
- Entrance of the Museo Dolores Olmedo, 2011
- Interactive fullscreen map
- Location: Mexico City
- Coordinates: 19°15′58″N 99°07′34″W

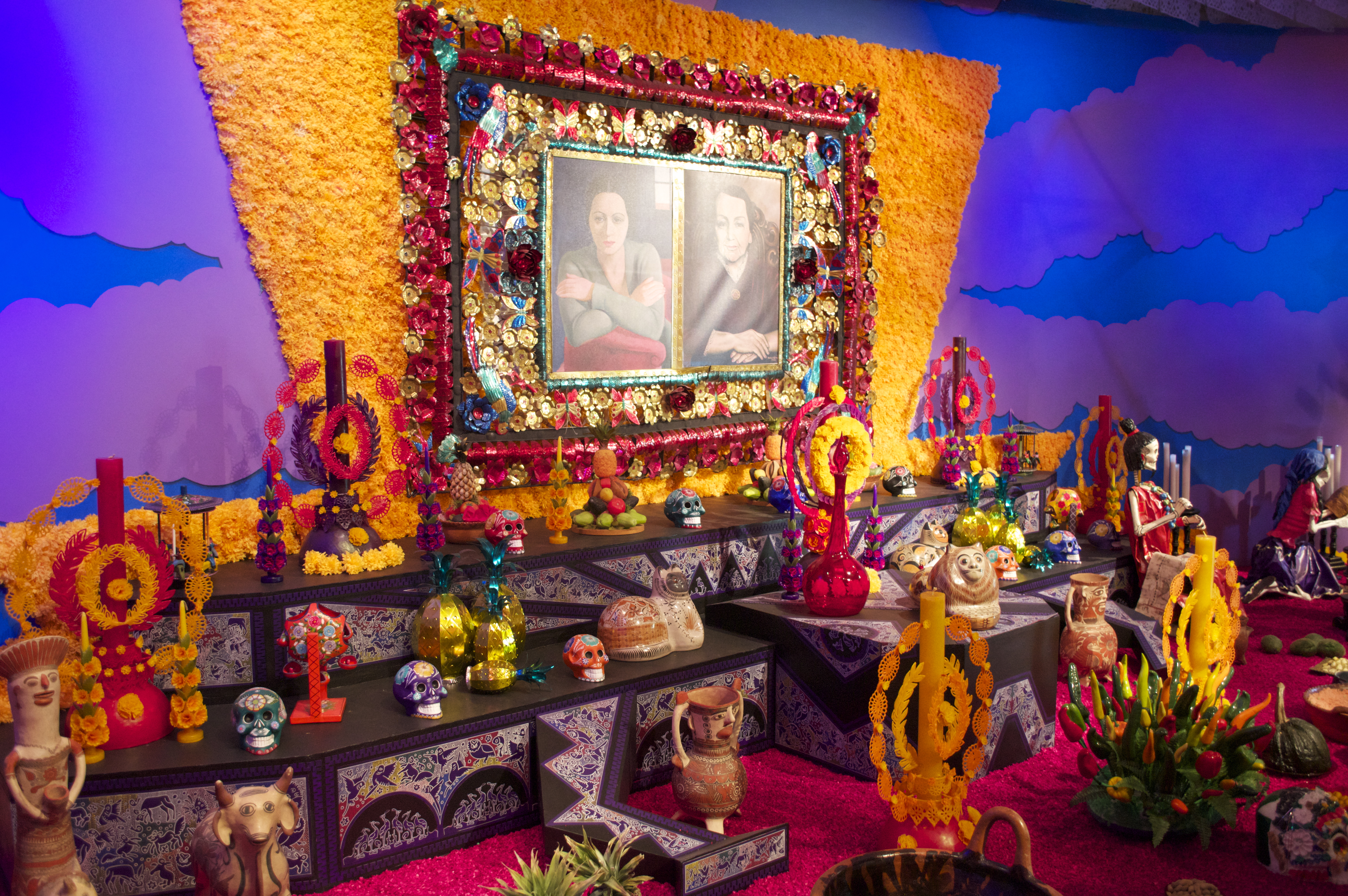
Altar to Dolores Olmedo at the Dolores Olmedo Museum for Day of the Dead.

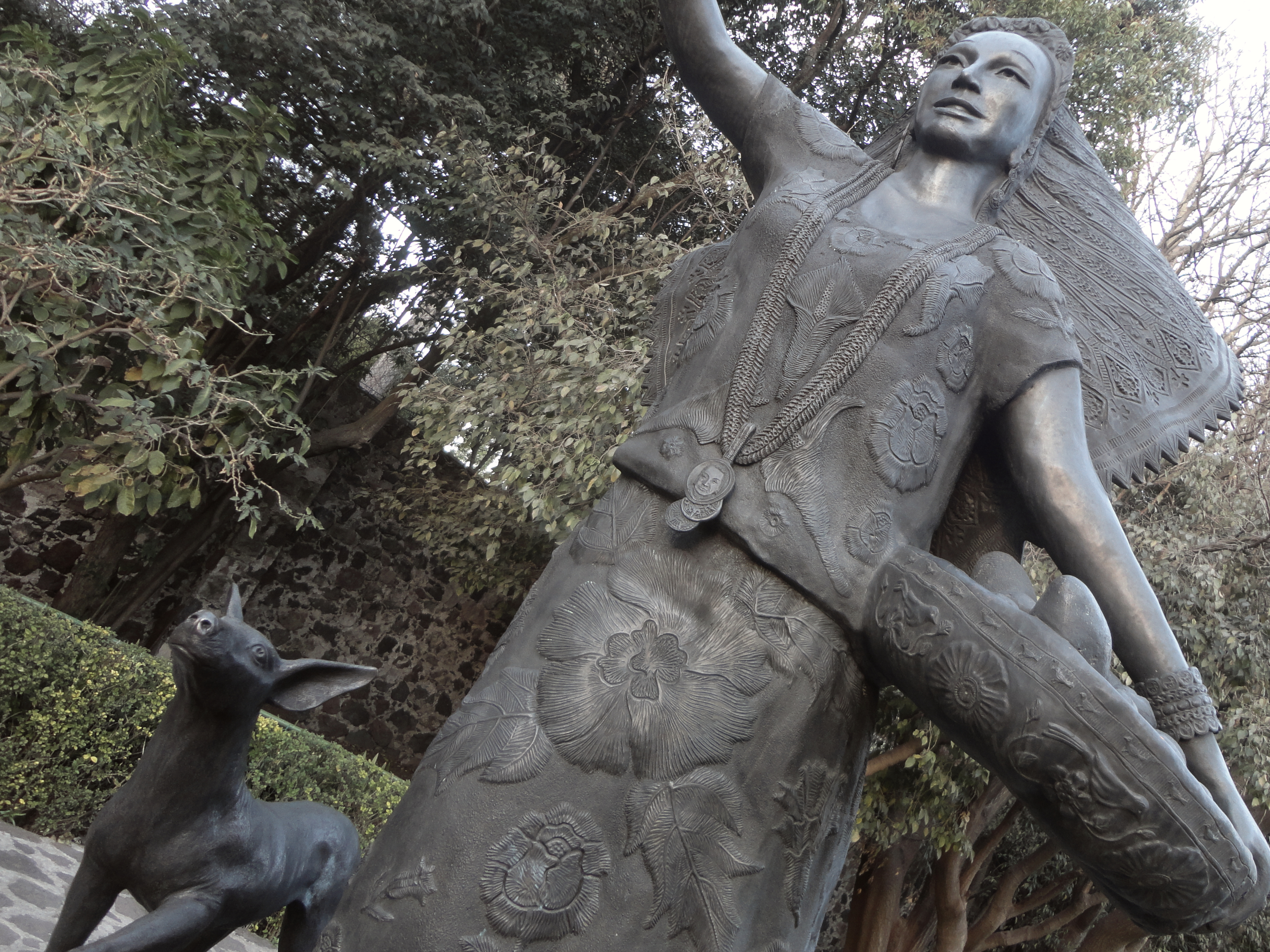
Statue of Dolores Olmedo

The Museo Dolores Olmedo (or the Dolores Olmedo Museum) is an art museum in Xochimilco, Mexico City, based on the collection of the Mexican businesswoman Dolores Olmedo.

== History ==
In 1962, Dolores Olmedo acquired a property at La Noria, Xochimilco in southern Mexico City, which she would later convert into the museum named after herself in 1994. Donating her entire collection of art including pre-Hispanic, colonial, folk, modern and contemporary art, the Dolores Olmedo Patiño Museum hosts the largest collection of Frida Kahlo, Diego Rivera, and Angelina Beloff artworks. Upon Olmedo's death in 2002, she left funds for the upkeep of the museum.

== Collections ==
The five-building complex contains up to 170 paintings, including 145 by Diego Rivera, 25 by his wife Frida Kahlo, some of their scripts and drawings, nearly 6,000 pre-Hispanic figurines and sculptures, and diverse living animals such as geese, ducks, six Xoloitzcuintles, and Indian peafowls kept in the museum's gardens.

== Renovations ==
In 2020, the museum closed for renovations and reopened in 2026. Private rooms where Olmedo kept her personal collection of ivory, china and artwork by artists she nurtured were opened to the public and there is a permanent exhibition of works by Russian-Mexican artist Angelina Beloff, who was Diego Rivera's first wife.

== Gallery ==
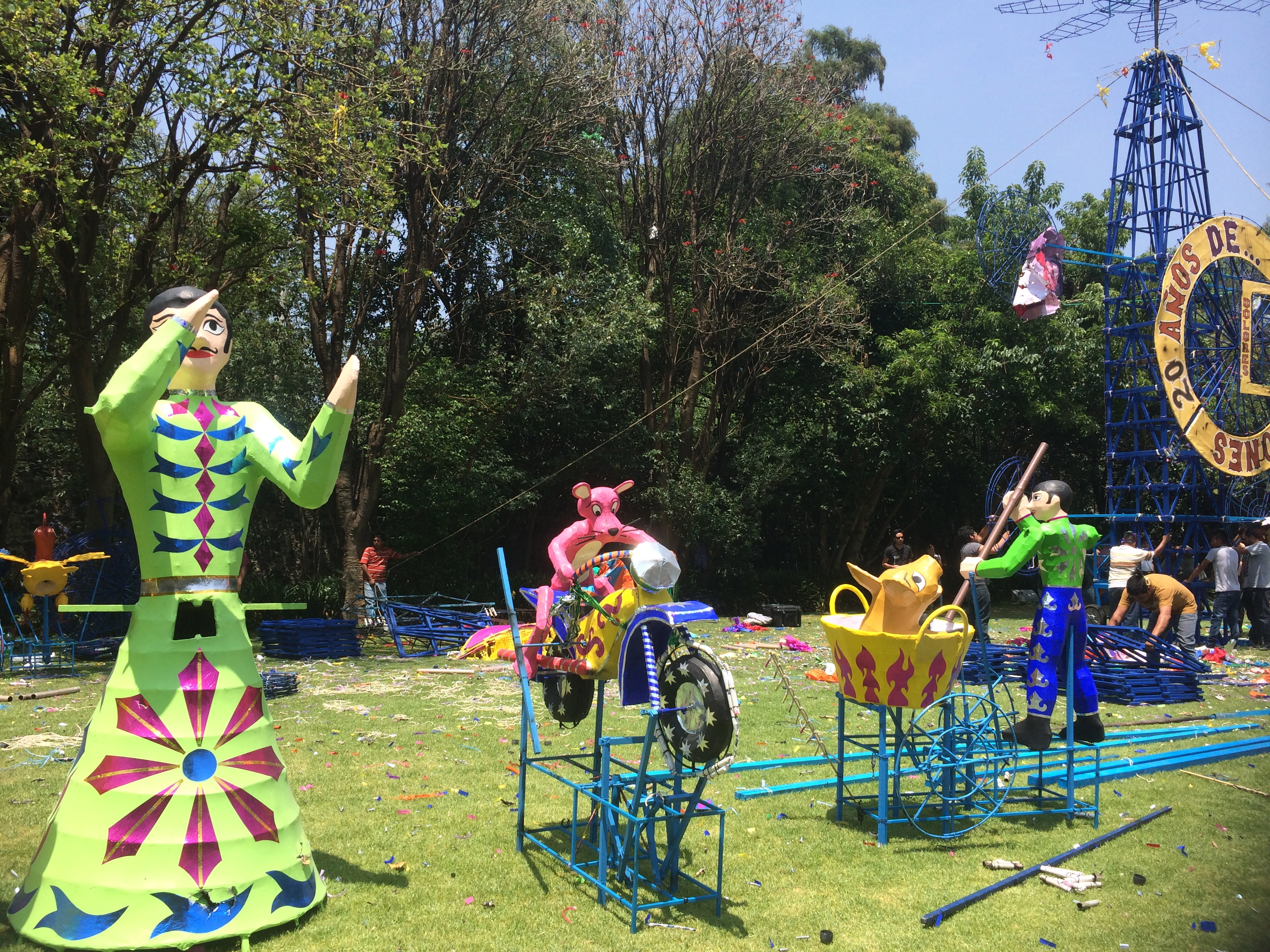
Traditional crafts at the museum

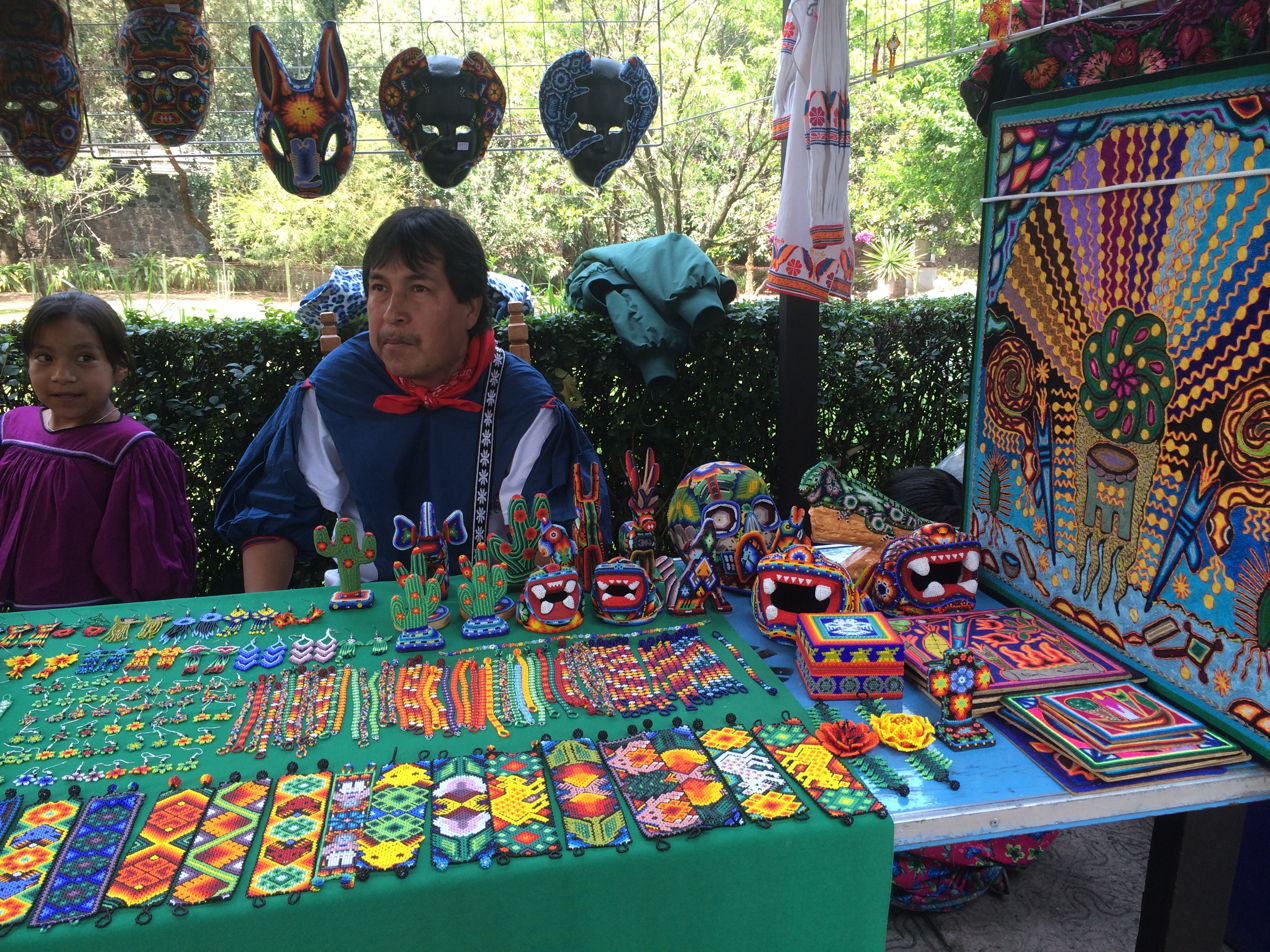

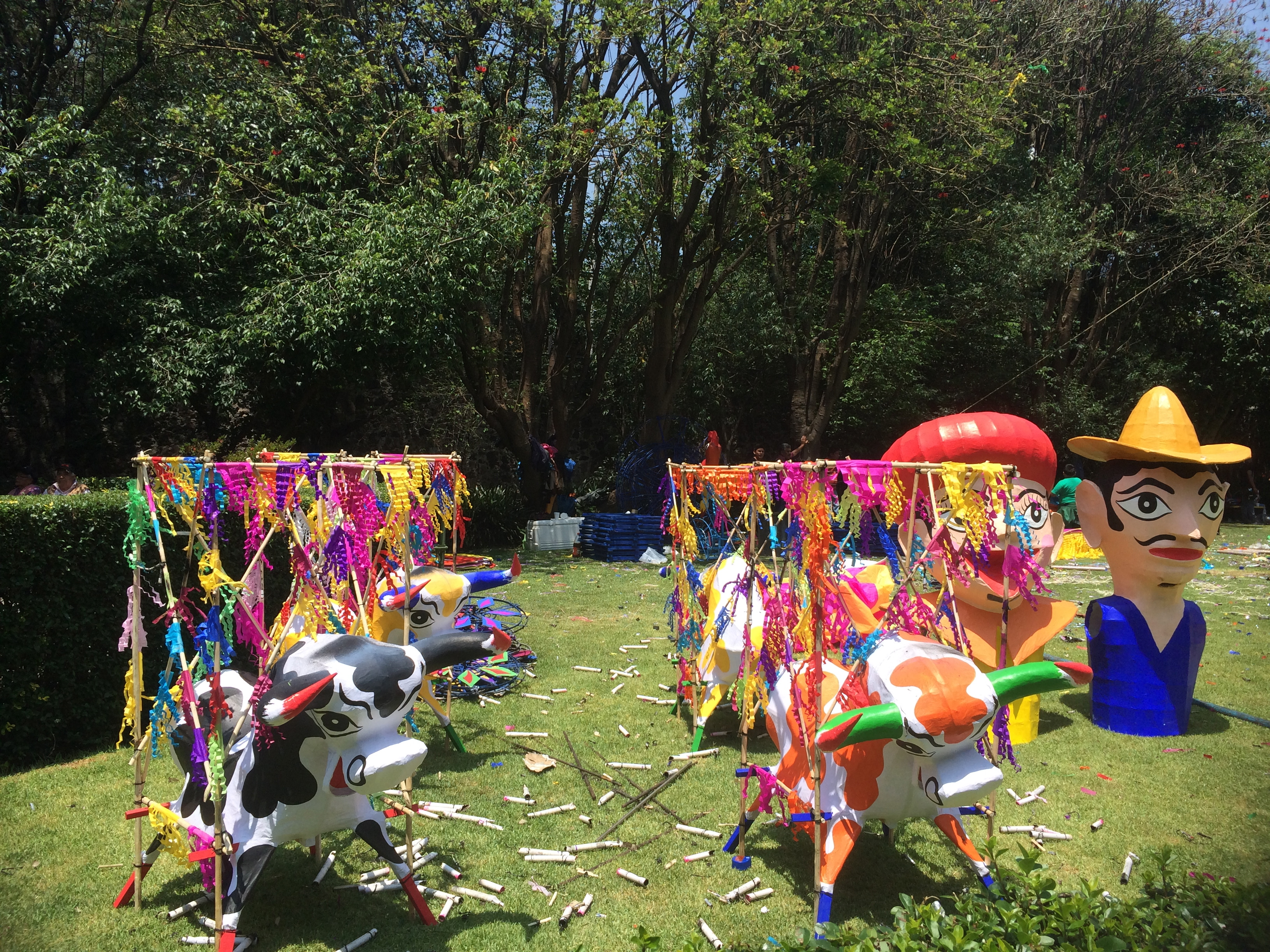
Traditional crafts exhibition

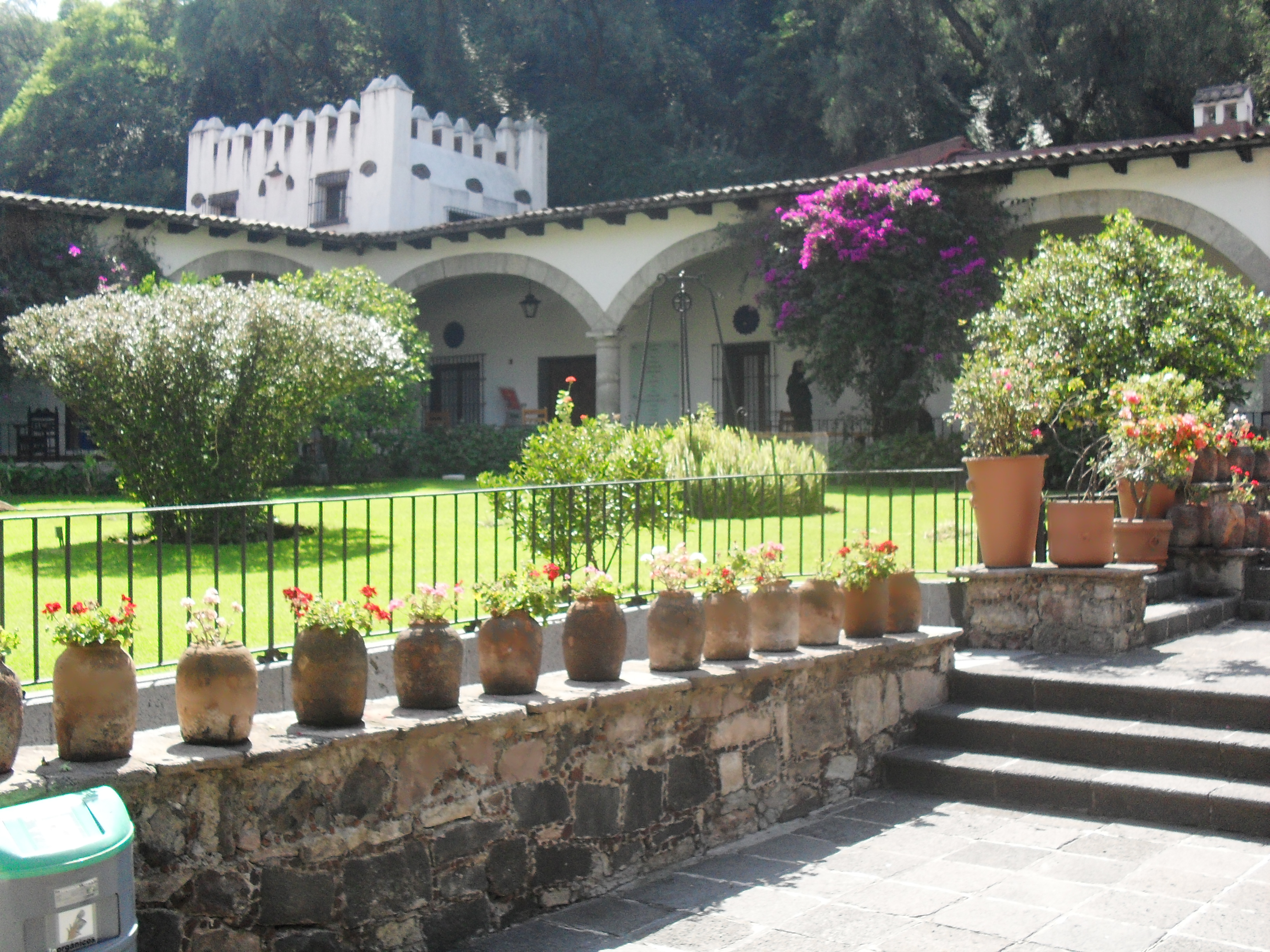
Building housing Frida Kahlo exhibition

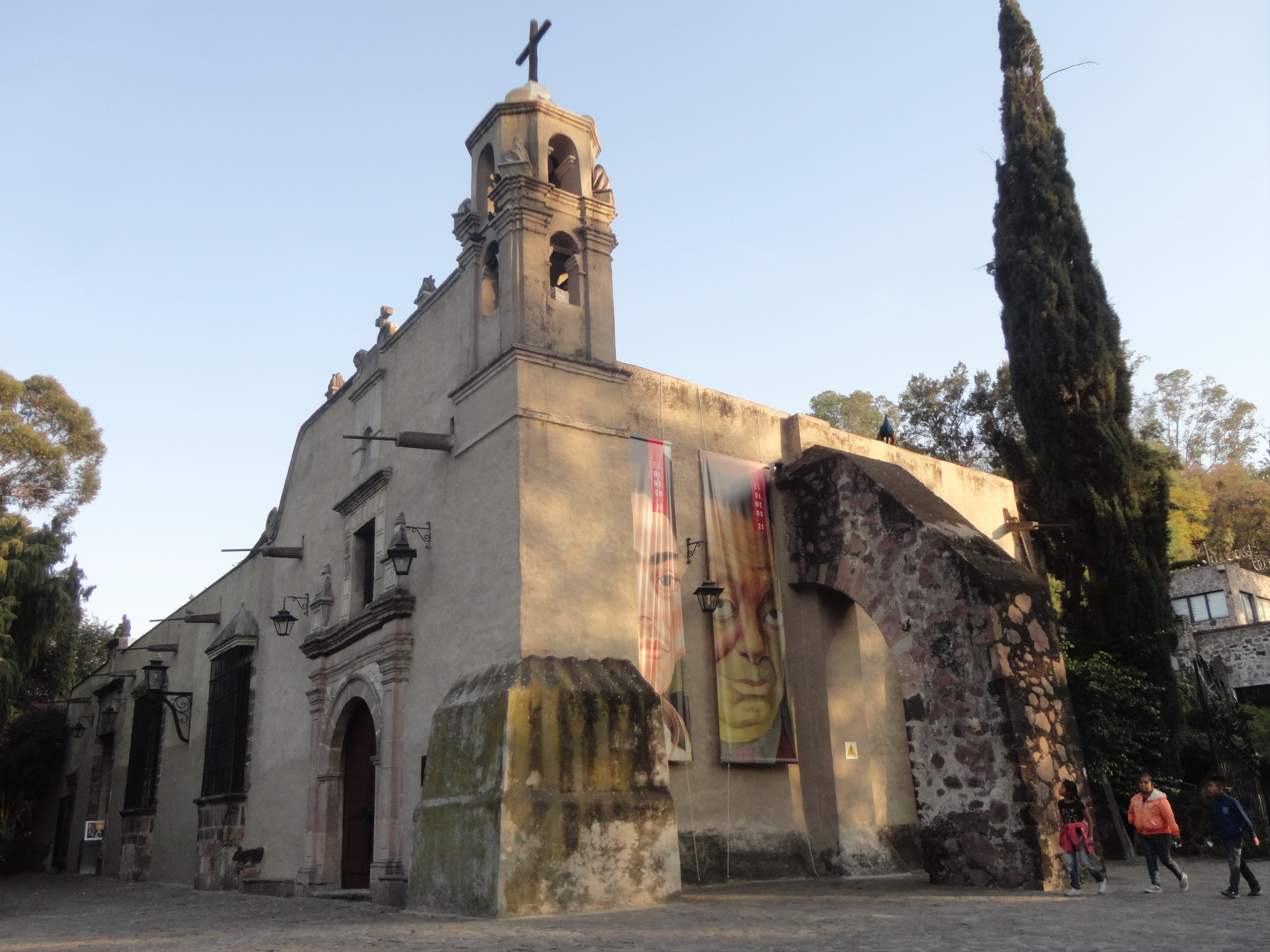
Old hermitage building on museum grounds
