= Hôtel du Paradis =

1986 film

- Directed by: Jana Boková
- Written by: Jana Boková
- Produced by: Simon Perry
- Starring: Fernando Rey
- Cinematography: Gérard de Battista
- Edited by: Yves Deschamps
- Release date: 1986
- Country: France
- Language: French
- Budget: £704,000

Hôtel du Paradis is a 1986 French drama film directed by Jana Boková. It was screened out of competition at the 1987 Cannes Film Festival.

== Cast ==
- Fernando Rey – Joseph
- Fabrice Luchini – Arthur
- Bérangère Bonvoisin – Frédérique
- Georges Géret – Dr. Jacob
- Hugues Quester – Maurice
- Marika Rivera – Marika
- Carola Regnier – Sarah
- Raúl Gimenez – Emilio
- Juliet Berto – Prostitute
- Sacha Briquet – Georges
- Lou Castel – Tramp
- Michael Medwin – English producer
- Sheila Kotkin – Sheila
- Aurelle Doazan – Dream Girl
- Max Berto – Max
- Pascal Aubier – Head Waiter
- Alex Joffé
- Artus de Penguern – Patric
- Zanie Campan – Lucienne Bayer
- Gilberte Géniat – Caretaker
- Madeleine Marie
- Consuelo de Haviland – Barbara
- Remi Deroche – Harry
- Catherine Mathely – Marianne
- Irene Langer – Irene
- Gérard Courant
