= Surrounded (2023 film) =

American film by Anthony Mandler

- Theatrical release poster
- Directed by: Anthony Mandler
- Written by: Andrew Pagana (Note: Pagana is credited as a writer twice; first as part of a team with Thomas, and again by himself.); Justin Thomas
- Produced by: Jason Michael Berman; Aaron L. Gilbert; Derek Iger; Anthony Mandler; Ade O’Adesina; Letitia Wright
- Starring: Letitia Wright; Jamie Bell; Michael K. Williams; Jeffrey Donovan; Brett Gelman
- Cinematography: Max Goldman
- Edited by: Ron Patane
- Music by: Robin Hannibal
- Production companies: Bron Studios; Blackhand Pictures; Mandalay Pictures; 3.16 Productions
- Distributed by: Metro-Goldwyn-Mayer Pictures
- Release dates: April 2, 2023 (Sun Valley Film Festival); June 20, 2023 (United States)
- Running time: 102 minutes
- Country: United States
- Language: English

Surrounded is a 2023 American Western drama film directed by Anthony Mandler and written by Andrew Pagana and Justin Thomas. It stars Letitia Wright, Jamie Bell, Jeffrey Donovan, Brett Gelman, and features Michael K. Williams in his final appearance.

The film premiered at the Sun Valley Film Festival on April 2, 2023, and was released digitally on June 20, 2023, by Metro-Goldwyn-Mayer Pictures.

== Plot ==
Five years after the Civil War, freedwoman and former Buffalo Soldier Moses "Mo" Washington travels west to lay claim to a gold mine disguised as a man after her stagecoach is ambushed by a group of murderous thieves. Mo is forced to hold legendary outlaw Tommy Walsh captive while the remaining surviving passengers seek out help.

== Cast ==
- Letitia Wright as Mo Washington
- Jamie Bell as Tommy Walsh
- Michael K. Williams as Will Clay
- Jeffrey Donovan as Wheeler
- Kevin Wiggins as Curly
- Brett Gelman as Mr. Fields
- Luce Rains as Goldie
- Andrew Pagana as Andy
- Augusta-Allen Jones as Mrs. Borders

== Production ==
It was announced in October 2020 that Letitia Wright, Jamie Bell and Michael K. Williams were set to star in the film, to be directed by Anthony Mandler. Principal photography began in November 2020, in New Mexico. In December 2020, Jeffrey Donovan and Brett Gelman joined the cast. On December 5, 2022, Metro-Goldwyn-Mayer Pictures acquired the film's world sales rights, and it was reported that post-production on the film took two years, in part due to the death of Williams.

== Release ==
Surrounded premiered as the closing night film of the Sun Valley Film Festival in Sun Valley, Idaho, on April 2, 2023. It was released digitally on June 20, 2023.

=== Critical response ===
On the review aggregator website Rotten Tomatoes, 88% of 26 critics' reviews are positive, with an average rating of 7/10. Metacritic, which uses a weighted average, assigned the film a score of 57 out of 100, based on seven critics, indicating "mixed or average" reviews.
