= Paul Angelis =

British actor (1943–2009)

- Born: 18 January 1943; Liverpool, England
- Died: 19 March 2009 (aged 66); Lambeth, London, England
- Occupation: Actor
- Years active: 1967–2009
- Relatives: Michael Angelis (brother)

Paul Angelis (18 January 1943 – 19 March 2009) was an English actor, best known for his role as PC Bruce Bannerman in the BBC police series Z-Cars and as Navy Rum in Porridge as well as doing many voices in the film Yellow Submarine.

== Early life ==
Angelis was born in Dingle, Liverpool to an English mother, Margaret (née McCulla), and a Greek father, Evangelos Angelis. He attended St Francis Xavier's Grammar School, Liverpool and St Mungo's Academy, Glasgow then worked for merchant banks for six years before training as an actor at the Royal Scottish Academy of Music and Drama. Having moved to London, he then toured with a children's theatre company.

== Career ==
Angelis provided the voice of Ringo Starr, George Harrison, and the Chief Blue Meanie in the film Yellow Submarine.

=== Television and film ===
He appeared in many British television programmes such as George and Mildred, Thriller, Callan, The Liver Birds, The Onedin Line, Man About the House, Quiller, The Sweeney – as armed robber and hard man, Barney Prince (episode: "Stoppo Driver"), The Gentle Touch, Bergerac, Armchair Theatre, Robin's Nest, Juliet Bravo, Coronation Street, Casualty, The Grimleys and Porridge – as the tattooed former seafarer 'Navy Rum'. He played PC Bruce Bannerman in 128 episodes of Z-Cars, and appeared in its spin-off Softly, Softly: Task Force – in the episode Shot in the Dark – playing a different character named Billet.

He also played Alf Garnett's son-in-law Mike in the 1972 film The Alf Garnett Saga. Some of his other films include The Mini-Affair (1967), Otley (1968), Battle of Britain (1969), Sweeney! (1977), Hussy (1980), For Your Eyes Only (1981) and Runners (1983).

=== Writer ===
He wrote several BBC radio shows, a television food programme for TSW and a novel.

== Personal life ==
Angelis was the oldest brother of actor Michael Angelis, who took over from Ringo Starr as the UK narrator of Thomas the Tank Engine and Friends, whom Paul Angelis voiced in the film Yellow Submarine.

== Death ==
Angelis died on 19 March 2009 in Lambeth, London, England, at the age of 66.

== Filmography ==
Year	Title	Role	Notes
1967	The Mini-Affair	2nd Car Policeman	
1968	Yellow Submarine	Ringo Starr / Chief Blue Meanie / George Harrison (Additional dialogue) / Narrator	Voice
1968	Otley	Constable	
1969	Battle of Britain	Albert	Uncredited
1972	Foursome	Dubbed Male Voices	Voice, uncredited
1972	The Alf Garnett Saga	Mike Rawlins	
1977	Sweeney!	Secret Serviceman	
1978	Force 10 from Navarone	Lieutenant	Voice, uncredited
1980	Hussy	Alex Denham, Beaty's ex-lover	
1981	For Your Eyes Only	Karageorge	
1983	Runners	The Radio Station – Tony Gavin	
1998	B. Monkey	Gangster	
2000	Stark	Dad	Short film
2002	Occasional, Strong	Tony	Short film
