= Hussy =

1980 film by Matthew Chapman

- Theatrical release poster
- Directed by: Matthew Chapman
- Written by: Matthew Chapman
- Produced by: Jeremy Watt
- Starring: Helen Mirren; John Shea; Paul Angelis; Murray Salem; Jenny Runacre; Patti Boulaye; Marika Rivera
- Cinematography: Keith Goddard
- Edited by: Bill Blunden
- Music by: George Fenton
- Distributed by: Watchgrove Films
- Release date: 1980
- Running time: 95 minutes
- Country: United Kingdom
- Language: English

Hussy is a 1980 British drama film written and directed by Matthew Chapman and starring Helen Mirren, John Shea, Paul Angelis, Murray Salem and Jenny Runacre.

== Plot ==
Beaty is a prostitute working at a London cabaret where Emory is a sound/lighting technician. They begin an affair encumbered by Beaty's job as a call girl. They fall in love but predictably he grows increasingly uncomfortable with her line of work. Emory has a bit of a dark secret from his past involving the accidental death of his wife. To further complicate things, Beaty has shared custody of a young son. Eventually a pair of unsavory characters from each of the lovers' pasts shows up and further endangers their love.

Emory's gay friend Max arrives and wants to cut Emory in on a drug deal. He is foppish, arrogant and abrasive. Beaty's abusive former lover, the father of her son and possibly her pimp is Alex, a strong-arm gorilla type, recently released from prison also arrives, needing a place to stay. Alex is clearly a brutish psychopath who threatens Beaty and Emory's future. Emory and Beaty's two past companions could not be more different. Max is sophisticated, articulate, stylish and outspoken. Alex is a working class English thug, quiet, simple and burning with violent rage. Beaty rebuffs Alex's desire to rekindle whatever they had and this enrages him. He does agree to be part of Max and Emory's caper (believing it to be gun smuggling).

On the day of the caper, Max, Emory and Alex end up in a car together with Max continuously taunting Alex. Alex finally has enough and shoots Max dead in the car. Emory and Alex dispose of the body and it becomes apparent that Alex is aware of Emory's intention to take Beaty and her son away. He is resigned to this and insists that Emory take some surplus cash found on Max's body. Emory drops Alex off with the smuggled drugs where Alex promises to 'take care of' (kill) the drugs' intended recipients to keep them from bothering Alex, Emory or Beaty.

When Emory and Beaty first reunite, she refuses to leave the country with him, citing a concern about her son, clearly having trouble uprooting and letting go of her past even though with the proceeds from the smuggling, they will be well set up and she will never have to work at her past profession again. The end shows Emory, Beaty and her child racing to catch a plane, free of their past encumbrances.

== Cast ==
- Helen Mirren as Beaty Simons
- John Shea as Emory Cole
- Paul Angelis as Alex Denham
- Murray Salem as Max
- Jenny Runacre as Vere
- Daniel Chasin as Billy
- Imogen Claire as Imogen
- Patti Boulaye as cabaret singer
- Marika Rivera as French singer

== Production ==
Hussy was part of a £3 million slate of five films produced by Don Boyd. Matthew Chapman called the film "primarily a love story about self obsession and self delusion."

The poster for Hussy was produced by poster artist Sam Peffer.

== Reception ==
The Daily Telegraph wrote "both characters and plot seem to be much underwritten."
