= Anya Teixeira =

British photographer

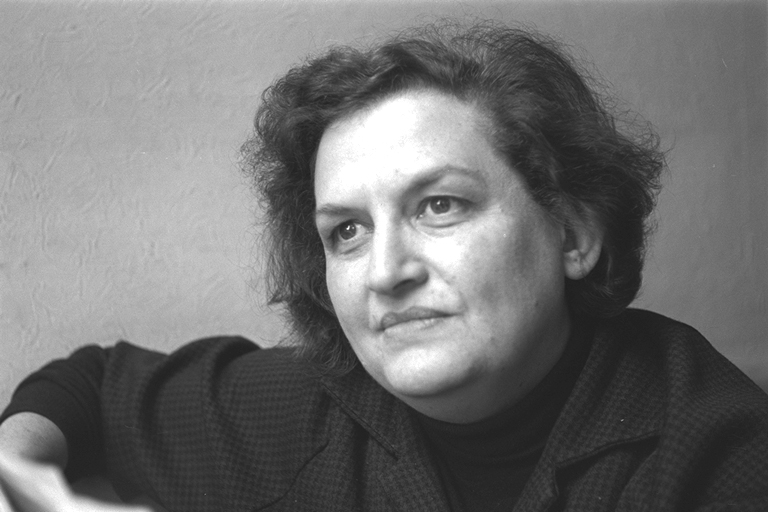
Anya Teixeira 1961

Anya Teixeira (1913 – 1992) was a Ukrainian-born British street photographer and photojournalist. Her work is held in the collection of the Victoria and Albert Museum, London.

== Biography ==
Teixeira's family escaped the Russian Revolution in 1917, through a rescue mounted by her uncle Morris Gest, a New York City impresario. The family settled in Berlin in 1924 so as to be near at hand for the expected overthrow of the Bolshevik regime. Fifteen years later her family had to flee from the Nazis. Arriving in England in April, 1939, she found that refugees like her were only allowed to be domestic servants or factory workers but she was eventually allowed an office job. She was to be penned into various secretarial positions until her retirement in 1975. Photography was a spare time activity taken up seriously at age 47. Three years later she co-founded the Creative Photo Group in London which drew approval from the historians Helmut and Alison Gernsheim in their book A Concise History of Photography.

== Exhibitions ==
- Fotoarbeiten, Congress Centrum, Hamburg
- On Stage, Camden Arts Centre, London
- Dancing in the Streets, Camden Arts Centre, London
- World Press Photo, The Hague
- Photokina (awarded Crystal Obelisk) Cologne
- Art for Society, Whitechapel Art Gallery, London, 1978
- Midland Arts Centre, Birmingham
- Midland Group, Nottingham
- British Council Travelling Exhibition (India, Pakistan, Sri Lanka)
- British Council Theatre Exhibition, Lisbon
- British Council Fringe Theatre Exhibition, Venezuela
- Women's Images of Men, ICA, London, 1980

== Collections ==
Teixeira's work is held in the following permanent collection:

- Victoria and Albert Museum, London: 4 prints (as of 8 March 2022)

== See also ==
- List of street photographers

== General references ==
- Walter Boje (editor) Foto Prisma, April 1963
- Anya Teixeira (contributor) AP, Calls for formation of Creative Photo Group, 14 August 1963
- Ainslie Ellis (reviewer) British Journal of Photography, 16 October 1964
- Anya Teixeira (invited reviewer) The Photographic Journal of the Royal Photographic Society, November 1967
