= Riding High (1981 film) =

- Original British quad poster
- Directed by: Ross Cramer
- Screenplay by: Ross Cramer
- Based on: Original story by Derek Ford
- Produced by: Michael Kilinger; Anthony Klinger
- Starring: Eddie Kidd; Irene Handl; Murray Salem
- Cinematography: Brian Tufano
- Edited by: John Jympson
- Music by: Paul Fishman
- Production company: Michael Klinger Productions
- Distributed by: Enterprise Pictures Limited (UK)
- Release date: May 1981 (UK)
- Running time: 96 minutes
- Country: United Kingdom
- Language: English
- Budget: £3 million

Riding High is a 1981 British drama film directed by Ross Cramer and starring Eddie Kidd, Irene Handl and Murray Salem. The screenplay concerns a bored young motorcycle messenger who begins training to take part in a major biking competition.

== Cast ==
- Eddie Kidd ... Dave Munday
- Irene Handl ... Gran
- Murray Salem ... Marvin Ravensdorf
- Marella Oppenheim ... Zoro
- Bill Mitchell ... Judas S. Chariot
- Zoot Money ... Dorking
- Paul Humpoletz ... Gelt
- Lynda Bellingham ... Miss Mott
- Daniel Peacock ... Clerk
- Owen Whittaker ... Astro
- Claire Toeman ... Jem
- Ken Kitson ... The Halifax Hellcat
- Vivienne McKone ... Minty
- Saiward Green ... Mol
- Peter Whitman ... Fred Turkey
- Angela Crow ... Beryl
- April Olrich ... Dorking's Bird
- Oliver Smith ... Burt Ganja
- Patricia Hodge ... Miss Hemmings
- Alan Dudley ... Mr. Willow
- Allan Warren ... Photographer
- Diana Weston ... Receptionist

== Production ==
The film was based on a script by sexploitation filmmaker Derek Ford, who had been impressed by the personality of stuntman Eddie Kidd when he saw Kidd interviewed on television. Ford wrote Bikers for Kidd, which was meant to be made for £500,000. Michael Klinger became involved as producer, and he felt the money could not be raised with Ford, so that filmmaker was eased out of production. The movie ended up being called Riding High and cost £3 million.

Ford says the movie was filmed with two endings, one where Kidd's character dies, the other where he lives. This was because no one was sure if Kidd would survive the final stunt sequence, where he jumped over a broken bridge. This stunt was the last part of the film shot.

Tony Klinger says the film ran out of money during production so his father Michael had to borrow money from a criminal to pay everyone.

== Reception ==
The film was not a success at the box office.

One critic called it "not so much a film as an excuse to show off" Kidd's "madcape motorbike stunts." Derek Ford called it a "lousy picture".
