= Juanita (2019 film) =

2019 American drama film

- Official poster
- Directed by: Clark Johnson
- Written by: Roderick Spencer
- Based on: Dancing on the Edge of the Roof by Sheila Williams
- Produced by: Stephanie Allain; Jason Michael Berman; Mel Jones
- Starring: Alfre Woodard; Adam Beach
- Cinematography: Luc Montpellier
- Edited by: Cindy Mollo
- Music by: Kevin Lax
- Production companies: Homegrown Pictures; Mandalay Pictures
- Distributed by: Netflix
- Release date: March 8, 2019 (United States)
- Country: United States
- Language: English

Juanita is a 2019 American drama film directed by Clark Johnson and adapted from a screenplay by Roderick M. Spencer, based upon the novel Dancing on the Edge of the Roof by Sheila Williams. Starring Alfre Woodard and Adam Beach, with Ashlie Atkinson, Sam Hennings, Blair Underwood, and LaTanya Richardson Jackson in supporting roles, it was released on March 8, 2019, by Netflix.

== Plot ==
Fed up with her life, a Columbus, Ohio woman leaves behind her adult children and her dead-end job taking care of patients at a nursing home and takes a Greyhound bus to Butte, Montana, where she reinvents herself and meets an interesting cast of characters at a French-cuisine restaurant.

== Cast ==
- Alfre Woodard as Juanita
- Adam Beach as Jess
- Ashlie Atkinson as Peaches
- Sam Hennings as Drew
- Blair Underwood as Himself
- LaTanya Richardson Jackson as Kay-Rita
- Marcus Henderson as Randy
- Elaine Miles as Mountain
- Taborah Johnson as Passenger out West
- Tsulan Cooper as Mary
- Bonnie Johnson as Ms. Berman
- Jordan Nia Elizabeth as Bertie
- Acoryé White as Rashawn
- Brian K. Landis as the Bus Driver
- Joseph Yates as Carl
- Kat Smith as Mignon
- Michael Harding as Nick
- Barry Ratcliffe as Charlie

== Production ==
In April 2017, it was announced Woodard, Beach, Blair Underwood, LaTanya Richardson Jackson, Marcus Henderson, Ashlie Atkinson, Tsulan Cooper, and Kat Smith, had joined the cast of the film, with Johnson directing from a screenplay by Roderick M. Spencer, based upon the novel by Sheila Williams. Stephanie Allain, Mel Jones and Jason Michael Berman produced the film under their Homegrown Pictures and Mandalay Pictures banners, respectively. Spencer is the husband of Alfre Woodard.

=== Filming ===
Principal photography began in April 2017, in Virginia.

== Release ==
In April 2017, Netflix acquired distribution rights to the film. It was released on March 8, 2019.

== Reception ==
On review aggregator website Rotten Tomatoes, the film holds an approval rating of 82% based on 17 reviews, with an average rating of 6.6/10. Site's Critics Consensus says: "Juanita's refreshing journey of self-actualization may lead to a predictable destination, but a sterling star turn by Alfre Woodard gives this sojourn an invaluable spark."

Woodard stated that a sequel was being written in an interview on the Kermode & Mayo Film Review podcast on 10 July 2020.
