= Jana Boková =

Czech film director

- Born: Prague, Czechoslovakia
- Occupation: Film director

Jana Boková is a Czech film director.

Boková was born in Prague, but left Czechoslovakia in August 1968 to attend a conference of art students in Austria, then emigrated to Paris, France to study at the Sorbonne. She then lived in the United States where she worked as a photographer for Rolling Stone and other magazines. She then lived in the United Kingdom for many years, studying at the National Film and Television School, and producing documentary films for British television.

She wrote and directed the 1986 drama film Hôtel du Paradis, which was shown out of competition at the Cannes Film Festival in 1987.

In 2001, Boková was approached by musician Eric Clapton to direct a music video, but ended up filming a feature-length documentary film called Eric Clapton and Friends which covered Clapton's band's rehearsals and preparations for a world tour.

In 2003, the Cinémathèque Française hosted a complete retrospective of Boková's work.

Her most recent film, Bye Bye Shanghai (2008), examines the concept of "exile" as it relates to Czech émigrés including herself.

In January and February 2020, the Czech Centre in London screened two of Boková's films - Havana (1990) and La Confiteria Ideal: The Tango Salon (2004), followed by a Q&A session with Boková, led respectively by Alan Yentob and Leslie Megahey.

They formed part of what was to have been a three-part season of her films at the centre, with Bye Bye Shanghai set to be the final one shown on 26 March along with a Q&A session with Boková, led by TV director and writer Henrietta Foster. However, because of the coronavirus pandemic, it was postponed indefinitely. The screening and Q&A session were subsequently rescheduled for 13 September 2021.

A retrospective featuring four of Boková's films – Hôtel du Paradis, Havana, An Argentinian Journey, and Sunset People – was held in Prague by the National Film Archive, in conjunction with the Libri Prohibiti, during May and June 2026.

Boková lives in Buenos Aires, Argentina.

== Filmography ==
This filmography is adapted from the Czech wikipedia article

Militia Battlefield (1975)

Just one more war (1977)

Marevna and Marika (1977–78)

Living Room (1978)

Blue Moon (1980)

Quinn Running (1980)

Sunset People (1983)

An Andalucian Journey (1985)

Tango Mio (1985)

Hôtel du Paradis (fiction, 1986)

Havana (1990)

An Argentinian Journey (1992)

Bahia of All the Saints (1994)

Diario para un cuento (fiction, 1998)

Avignon (1999)

Mexico (2000)

Eric Clapton & Friends (2002)

Tango Salon (2004)

Bye Bye Shanghai (2008)
