= Marcus Henderson (actor) =

American actor (born 1987)

- Born: September 13, 1987 (age 38); St. Louis, Missouri, U.S.
- Education: Alabama State University (BA); Yale University (MFA)
- Occupation: Actor
- Years active: 2009–present
- Children: 2

Marcus Henderson (born May 17, 1987) is an American actor best known for his role as Walter in the film Get Out (2017).

== Early life ==
Henderson was born in St. Louis to Leon and Barbara Henderson. He attended college at Alabama State University on a football scholarship and is a member of Phi Beta Sigma. While there, he saw a one-man show performed by Charles S. Dutton, which led to his first professional role as an uncredited extra in the film Honeydripper. Dutton wrote Henderson a letter of recommendation to Yale School of Drama, where Henderson graduated in 2011.

== Career ==
Henderson has said theater is "his first love". He has performed Shakespeare both at Yale and the California Shakespeare Company. Henderson's first role in a major motion picture was as the character Big Sid in Django Unchained. In 2016, he portrayed one of the henchmen in Pete's Dragon. In 2017, he had a supporting role in the film Get Out and a recurring role on Snowfall. In 2019, Henderson appeared in Juanita and is a part of the cast of Tacoma FD.

== Personal life ==
Henderson is married, has a daughter and son, and lives in Los Angeles.

== Filmography ==
Year	Title	Role	Notes
2007	Honeydripper	Dancing man	Uncredited
2012	Django Unchained	Big Sid	
2014	Whiplash	Bassist (JVC)	
2014	Bobo Noir	Waiter	
2014	College Musical	Kingston Host	
2015	Woodlawn	Reginald	
2016	Halfway	Paulie	
2016	Pete's Dragon	Woodrow	
2017	Get Out	Walter	
2017	Snowfall	Sgt. Andre Wright	Recurring cast
2018	Insidious: The Last Key	Detective Whitfield	
2018	Lemon Drop	Ted	
2019	Juanita	Randy	
2019	Tacoma FD	Granfield "Granny" Smith	Main cast
2025	Run	Oumar	
2026	The Lincoln Lawyer (TV series)	Yannick Bamba	

=== Television series ===
- Rick and Morty - Additional voices
