= Burning Sands (2017 film) =

2017 film by Gerard McMurray

- original film poster
- Directed by: Gerard McMurray
- Written by: Gerard McMurray; Christine Berg
- Produced by: Stephanie Allain; Jason Michael Berman; Reginald Hudlin; Mel Jones; Camila Tanabe (assoc.); Patrick Raymond (assoc.)
- Starring: Trevor Jackson; Alfre Woodard; Steve Harris; Tosin Cole; DeRon Horton; Christian Robinson; Trevante Rhodes; Jay Q Saun; Serayah
- Cinematography: Isiah Donté Lee
- Edited by: Evan Schrodek
- Music by: Kevin Lax
- Production companies: Mandalay Pictures; Homegrown Pictures; Hudlin Entertainment; Freedom Road Productions
- Distributed by: Netflix
- Release dates: January 24, 2017 (Sundance); March 10, 2017 (United States)
- Running time: 102 minutes
- Country: United States
- Language: English

Burning Sands is a 2017 American drama film, directed by Gerard McMurray, from a screenplay by McMurray and Christine Berg. It stars Trevor Jackson, Alfre Woodard, Steve Harris, Tosin Cole, DeRon Horton and Trevante Rhodes.

The film had its world premiere at the Sundance Film Festival on January 24, 2017, before being released on March 10, 2017, by Netflix.

== Plot ==
Six young men pledge Lambda Lambda Phi Fraternity at a historically Black institution, Frederick Douglass University. On the first day of Hell Week, one pledge drops out of the pledging process while trying to protect another pledge. Zurich leads the pledge class as they endure hazing on campus and at the fraternity house. Zurich balances his time in class with English professor Hughes and his new fraternity life of parties, sorority girls, and dating. The pledge class learns the fraternity's brotherhood mottos and bonds together through the mental and physical hazing. They endure physical abuse through paddling, being pelted with tennis balls while blindfolded in a swimming pool and also forced to buy the current Lambda brothers food and beer for their parties.

Dean Richardson, a Lambda Lambda Phi alumnus, holds himself out as an example of the fraternity system and extols its virtues. He makes himself available to be told of pledge abuse but does not take action to break the fraternity code of silence and secrecy. On the final night of Hell Week named "Hell Night", the hazing goes too far and a big brother advises the pledge class to drop off a seriously injured pledge, Frank, at the emergency room but to avoid the cameras. Despite this advice, the pledges wait together at the hospital for news of Frank's fate. A doctor later tells them that Frank died of a ruptured aorta. Zurich takes out his cell phone and calls his dad, realizing why his father never joined the fraternity, and the movie ends.

== Cast ==
- Trevor Jackson as Zurich, a biology pre-medicine Lambda pledge whose father was previously a Lambda pledge but did not complete. His alumni big brother is current doctor, Malcolm.
- Alfre Woodard as Professor Hughes, an English professor who knows what Zurich is going through and mentors him to be a better man and student.
- Steve Harris as Dean Richardson, a Lambda alumni
- Tosin Cole as Frank, a pledge who is a Lambda legacy whose father and grandfather were both Lambda alumni. Originally, he is distant from his line brothers but learns to value their brotherhood.
- DeRon Horton as Earnest (Square), a highly intelligent but awkward man who pledges Lambda for the social upgrades it will bring him. His alumni big brother is a businessman.
- Dominique Mari as Tiffany
- Mitchell Edwards as Stephon
- Jeremy Rudd as Christopher
- Christian Robinson as Big Country, a current Lambda who torments the pledges sadistically.
- Trevante Rhodes as Fernander, the Dean of Pledges for the five Lambda pledges. He looks out for the line and frequently stops the hazing before it gets too serious.
- Malik Bazille as Dwight, a college football player who pledges Lambda. His alumni big brother is a professional football player.
- Octavius J Johnson as Ron, a devout Christian man who pledges Lambda
- Rotimi Akinosho as Edwin, the president of Lambda Lambda Phi
- Serayah as Angel, a sorority girl in the sister sorority to Lambda Lambda Phi
- Nafessa Williams as Toya, a worker at What-A-Burger who interacts with the Lambdas frequently.
- Imani Hakim as Rochon, Zurich's girlfriend who is concerned about his Hell Week status.
- Adriyan Rae as Candy
- Racquel Bianca John as Joy
- Chiké Okonkwo as Breyton

== Production ==
In January 2016, it was announced Gerard McMurray would direct the film, from a screenplay by himself and Christine Berg, while Stephanie Allain, Jason Michael Berman of Mandalay Pictures, Reginald Hudlin and Shawn Knapp will serve as producers on the film alongside Netflix. In January 2017, Common boarded the film as an executive producer and will contribute an original song to the film.

== Release ==
The film had its world premiere at the Sundance Film Festival on January 24, 2017. It was released on March 10, 2017, by Netflix.

== Reception ==
Burning Sands received positive reviews from film critics. It currently holds an 88% approval rating on review aggregator Rotten Tomatoes, based on 25 reviews, with an average rating of 7.1/10. On Metacritic, the film has a weighted average rating of 63 out of 100, based on 7 reviews, indicating "generally favorable" reviews.

== See also ==
- List of black films of the 2010s
- School Daze (1988)
