= Murray Salem =

American actor

Murray Salem (January 12, 1950 – January 6, 1998) was an American television actor and screenwriter.

He appeared in a number of television shows as an actor, including the miniseries Jesus of Nazareth as Simon the Zealot. He wrote the script for the 1990 Arnold Schwarzenegger film Kindergarten Cop.

Murray Salem died in Los Angeles, California, on January 6, 1998, from AIDS complications, aged 47.

== Filmography ==
Year	Title	Role	Notes
1977	Jesus of Nazareth	Simon the Zealot	1 episode
1977	The Spy Who Loved Me	USS Wayne Crewman #2	
1977	Valentino	Vagrant	
1978	Let's Get Laid	Heavy	
1978	The Pirate	Ramadan	TV film
1979	Institute for Revenge	Sam	TV film
1980	Brave New World	Chief Engineer	TV film
1980	Hussy	Max	
1981	Riding High	Marvin Ravensdorf	(final film role)
1992	Naked Hollywood (A & E Network Documentary hosted by Jack Perkins) Part IV: "Screenwriters: Funny for Money"		
