= Jean Paul Brusset =

French painter

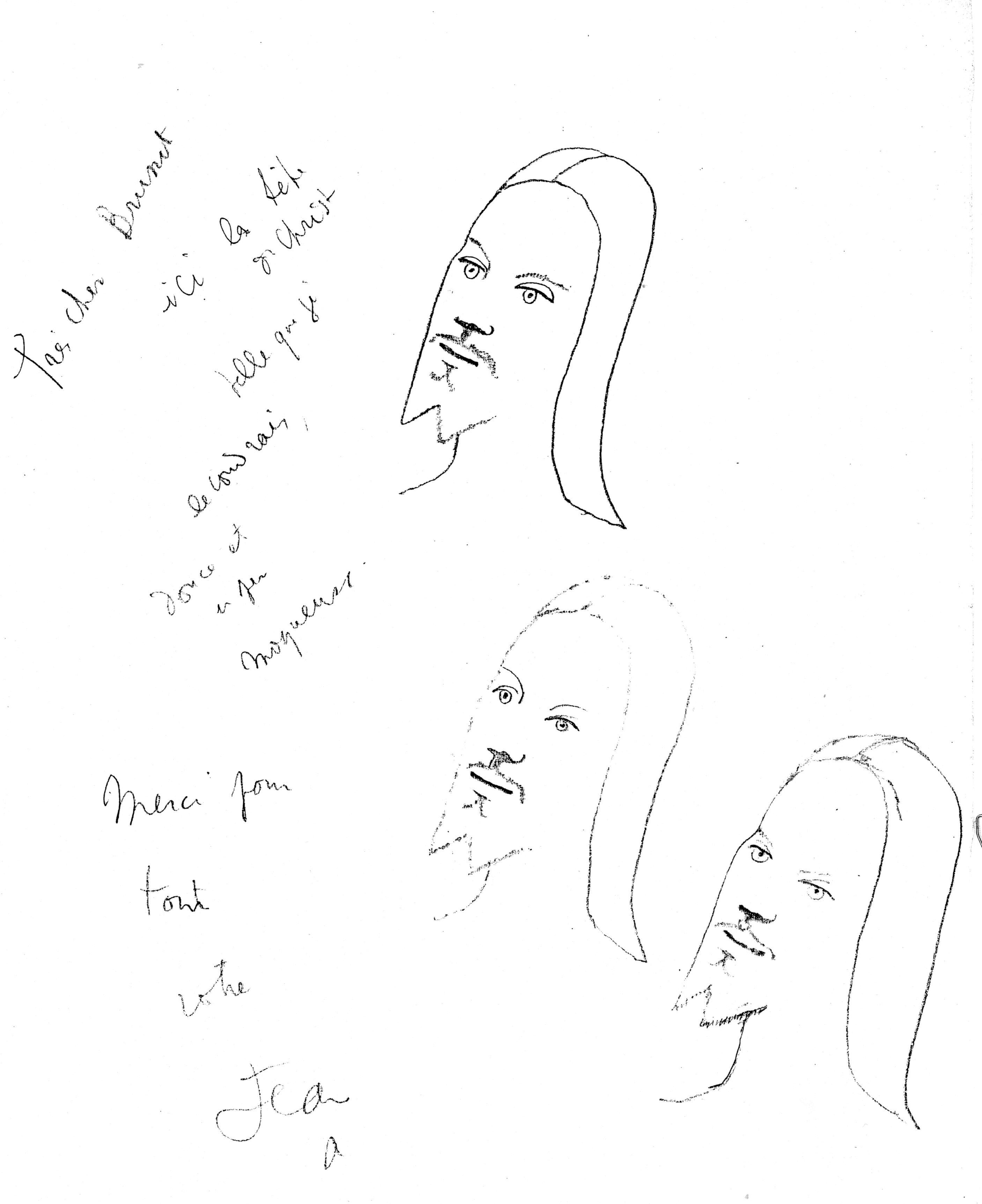
Lettre Cocteau à Brusset02

Jean Paul Brusset (23 June 1909–1985) was an internationally acclaimed painter with what has been described as "a strong Mediterranean flair". He was born in Pont du Gard, near Nîmes, in Provence, France.

In 1929, after completing his higher education at the college in Uzès, Brusset travelled to Paris where he enrolled at L'École des Arts Appliqués et des Arts Decoratifs and sold his first painting, Le Pont d'Avignon. He went on to exhibit in major galleries such as the Salon des Tuileries and soon earned his first special exhibition. In the preface to the exhibition catalogue Tristan Bernard commended him as "A good painter and a true interpreter of nature".

During the difficult economic times of the 1930s Brusset survived as a decorator, most notably at the Cannes Film Festival. In 1938 he married Marika Rivera, the daughter of the Russian émigré cubist painter Marie Vorobieff (also known as Marevna) and the Mexican cubist painter and muralist Diego Rivera; and they had a son together named Jean Diego Brusset. The marriage did not last long.

On the outbreak of World War II in 1939 Brusset was called up to the French Navy. In 1942, he left France for Algiers, where he decorated the studio of the Voice of America. An exhibition in Tunis followed. In 1945 he returned to Paris and re-established himself there with an exhibition in 1946. In L'Amateur d'Art, there was reference to his "hitherto much ignored talent"; and he was being admired as a "true painter" with a "serious heart", a "profound interior life".

During 1948 to 1954 Brusset travelled to Caracas, Venezuela and San Juan, Puerto Rico and spent time in the United States with his exhibition Paris by Brusset under the patronage of the cultural attaché of the French embassy in Washington, D.C. As a result of their successful exhibition of his works acquired by the Delgado Museum of Art in New Orleans, Brusset was made a Citizen of Honour of the town and Colonel of the Guard of Honour of the Lord Governor of Louisiana, an honour never previously conferred upon a foreigner. The exhibition then visited many cities, including Memphis, Dallas, San Francisco, New York, Miami, Montreal and Toronto.

In 1955 Brusset returned to France, where an exhibition of his ceramics presented at Cannes won him the award of the L'Academie Internationale de la Ceramique of Geneva. In 1956 he collaborated with Jean Cocteau in the decoration of the chapel of Saint Pierre in Villefranche-sur-Mer; and in 1957 he exhibited at the Galerie Vendôme in Paris. The paintings were subsequently bought by the French government.

Brusset's last special exhibition was La Provence du Brusset, organized by the mayor of Baux-de-Provence on the occasion of the 150th anniversary of the birth of Frédéric Mistral in 1980.

This article uses information from the biography by M. J. Tatum and list of exhibitions (cf. External links).
