= Walter Boje =

German photographer

Walter Boje (16 November 1905 – 20 July 1992) was a German photographer. He is considered a pioneer of creative colour photography.

== Life ==
Born in Berlin, Boje studied national economics and graduated as an economist. In 1932 he was awarded a doctorate in economics with the thesis The International Iron Pact in Berlin. From 1939, he was Secretary General of the German Academy of Aeronautical Research. After the Second World War, he opened a photocopying business in Berlin, worked as a photojournalist and later went to Hamburg as a theatre photographer. In 1954, he moved to Agfa in Leverkusen, for which he worked until 1969, among other things, in the phototechnical headquarters and as head of the advertising studio.

In 1959, he met the choreographer and ballet director Aurel von Milloss in Cologne, who was about to develop a new form of ballet. Walter Boje succeeded in capturing Milloss' choreographic ideas photographically, using colour in particular as a means of expression. This means of expression was recognised by Heinz Hajek-Halke and Peter Cornelius, among others, and was trend-setting for younger colleagues such as Horst H. Baumann and Kilian Breier.

Boje taught at the German Institute for Journalistic Education in Düsseldorf, at the Ludwig-Maximilians-Universität München (LMU) in Munich and at the German School of Journalism. He lectured in several European countries, in the USA and in Canada.

Boje was a member of the BFF Berufsverband Freie Fotografen und Filmgestalter and for several years 1st chairman and later honorary president of the Deutsche Journalistenschule (GDL). For twelve years he was a member of the board and for many years head of the Image Section of the German Society for Photography (DGPh), which appointed him as its honorary member in 1976 and awarded him the "Golden Badge of Honour" in 1985. In 1989, he was awarded the title of professor by the state of North Rhine-Westphalia.

Boje considered himself a "feature writer with a camera". His companion Leo Fritz Gruber wrote about him: "Walter Boje was an unconditional advocate of photography - without him, photography, especially the development of colour photography in Germany, in Europe, would have been in a worse state. He not only produced exemplary creative colour light images of his own, but also acted as a supportive mentor for young photographers. - And he was a friend to me."

Boje is Kornelia Boje's father.

== Publications ==
- Das kleine Agfacolor 1 × 1. Umschau, Frankfurt, 1956. 8th edition 1967.
- Vom Foto zum Lichtbild. Knapp, Düsseldorf 1956.
- Farbe überall. Umschau, Frankfurt, 1960.
- Magie der Farbenphotographie. Econ, Düsseldorf 1961.
- Mut zur Farbe. Umschau, Frankfurt, 1963.
- Fotografieren mein Hobby. Südwest, Munich 1965.
- Portraits in Farbe. Knapp, Düsseldorf 1976, ISBN 3-87420-083-3.

== Honours ==
- Exhibition: Magie von Farbe und Bewegung – Dem Photographen Walter Boje zum 100. Geburtstag. Deutsches Tanzarchiv/SK Stiftung Kultur, Cologne, 28 January – 10 April 2005.
- Festschrift: Walter Boje – Geburtstag. Compiled by Dino Simonett in collaboration with Bruno Margreth. Edition Dino Simonett, Zürich 2005, ISBN 3-905562-20-0.
