= Ryan Piers Williams =

American actor and film director

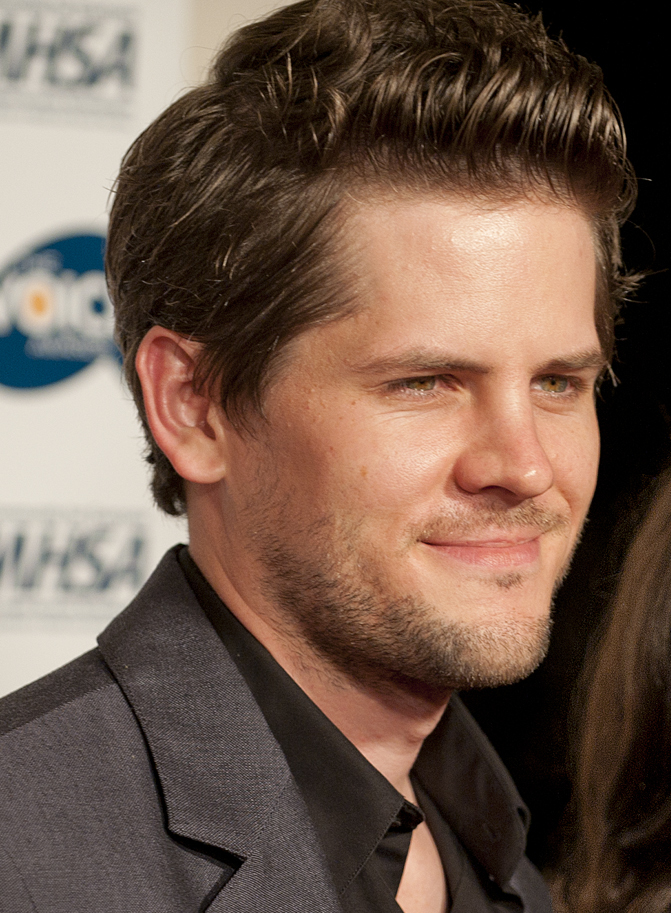
- Williams in 2010
- Born: May 13, 1981 (age 45)
- Citizenship: USA
- Occupations: Actor, producer, director, writer
- Years active: 2001–present
- Spouse: America Ferrera (m. 2011)
- Children: 2
- Website: www.ryanpierswilliams.com

Ryan Piers Williams (born May 13, 1981) is an American actor, director, and writer.

== Early life ==
Williams was raised in El Paso, Texas, where he attended J. M. Hanks High School. From age 13 he wanted to be a director and took theater and video production classes in both middle school and high school. He went to study film at the University of Texas at Austin for 2½ years before transferring as a junior to the University of Southern California and eventually being accepted into its School of Cinematic Arts where he met actress America Ferrera and cast her in a student film. The two became romantically involved through their academic film work and officially became a couple on June 27, 2005.

== Career ==
Williams wrote and directed the films The Dry Land (2010) and X/Y (2014). He was a producer of writer-director Walter Strafford's Kilimanjaro (2013). Williams additionally has performed as an actor, in the 2007 short Muertas, which he directed, wrote and produced; and the features Blues (2008), Tomorrow Comes Today (2013), his own X/Y (2014), and 1985 (2018). He briefly appears in Barbie (2023) as the husband of Gloria, played by his real life wife America Ferrera.

== Personal life ==
Williams married America Ferrera on June 27, 2011. He directed her in the 2010 film The Dry Land, which received Imagen Awards nominations for best feature film and for Ferrera's performance as best actress. The couple had their son, Sebastian, in May 2018, and daughter, Lucia, on May 4, 2020.

== Filmography ==
- The Dry Land (2010)
- Kilimanjaro (2013)
- X/Y (2014)
- Barbie (2023)
