= Dolores Olmedo =

Mexican businesswoman

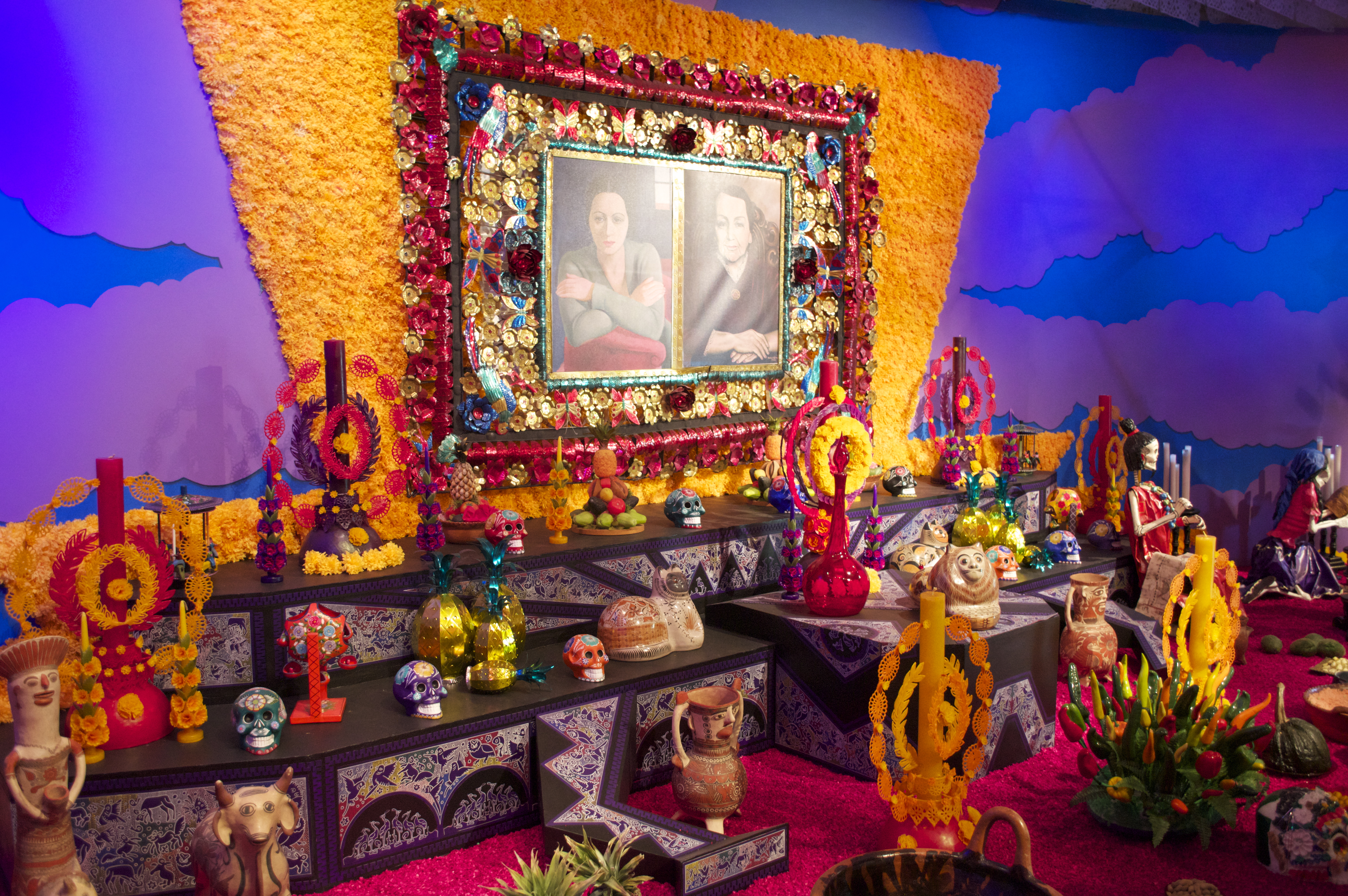
Altar to Dolores Olmedo at the Dolores Olmedo Museum for Day of the Dead.

María de los Dolores Olmedo y Patiño Suárez (December 14, 1908 – July 26, 2002; Mexico City) was a Mexican businesswoman, philanthropist and musician, better known for her friendship with the Mexican painters Frida Kahlo and her husband Diego Rivera; she appeared in some of his paintings. Following Rivera's death in 1957, she and Rivera's daughter Guadalupe asked then president Adolfo López Mateos to consider Rivera and José Clemente Orozco's paintings historical monuments.

== Museo Dolores Olmedo ==
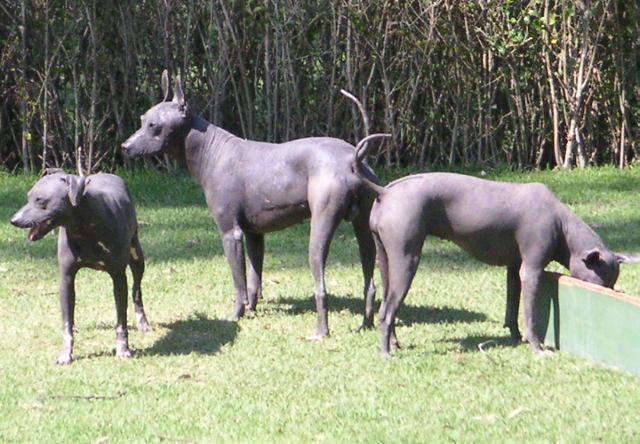
Three Xoloitzcuintles at the museum.

In 1962, she acquired a property at La Noria in Xochimilco, southern Mexico City, which she later converted into a museum named after herself in 1994. Donating her entire collection of art including pre-Hispanic, colonial, folk, modern and contemporary art, the Dolores Olmedo Patiño Museum host the greatest collection of Frida Kahlo, Diego Rivera and Angelina Beloff. On her death in 2002, she left funds for taking care of her museum, now open to the public.

The five-building complex contains up to 150 paintings, including 145 Riveras, 25 Kahlos (and some of their scripts and drawings), nearly 6,000 pre-Hispanic figurines and sculptures as well as diverse living animals such as geese, ducks, six Xoloitzcuintles and Indian peafowls kept in gardens. New areas have been added to the museum, "her private rooms" where she kept original decorations of her house such as ivory, china and artwork by artists whom she nurtured in her latter years including José Juárez and Francisco Guevara.

== Publication of indigenous songs ==
For decades, Olmedo collected songs and stories from various indigenous groups in Mexico, translated them into Spanish and published them. The Nahuatl freedom song "Resistencia frente a la noche"

Resistance in the Face of Night (Translation: Samuel Becket)

We were without direction,

A people, to death condemned,

The mighty lost in their defection,

By their own impotence condemned.

A light broke the night from the west:

An angel with a fiery sword!

He showed us through signs and gestures

What had so long been ignored:

"Gather the best in the land,

Break the yoke of lies with a hand!

There's only one way from disgrace,

And this path, it leads to the right place." (Refrain)

Then courage grew within us anew,

To end the eternal shame,

We were once more true to ourselves,

And thus broke our chain.

The angel rose high in the sky,

His example ignited us bright,

We left all the tombs behind,

Drawn by the growing light.

Now we hope again for the morrow,

And stoke the flame to burn,

Love for the land, long hidden,

Ignited by despair and yearn.

And soon the fire will enlighten

All those who are still blind,

Even those who poisoned the source,

If they can be redeemed in kind....

The song is also sung today in Spanish and partly in English by various groups in Latin America as a song of political resistance.

== Tribute ==
In 2018, a Google Doodle was created to celebrate what would have been her 110th birthday.
