= The Dry Land =

American drama film

- Directed by: Ryan Piers Williams
- Written by: Ryan Piers Williams
- Produced by: Heather Rae
- Starring: Ryan O'Nan; America Ferrera; Wilmer Valderrama; Jason Ritter; Melissa Leo
- Cinematography: Gavin Kelly
- Edited by: Sabine Hoffman
- Music by: Dean Parks
- Distributed by: Maya Entertainment; Freestyle Releasing
- Release dates: January 24, 2010 (Sundance); July 30, 2010 (United States)
- Running time: 92 minutes
- Country: United States
- Language: English
- Box office: $11,777

The Dry Land (also known as American Tragic) is a 2010 American drama film written and directed by Ryan Piers Williams. The film stars Ryan O’Nan, America Ferrera, Wilmer Valderrama, Jason Ritter, and Melissa Leo. It premiered at the 2010 Sundance Film Festival and opened in limited release on July 30, 2010.

== Plot ==
James returns from Iraq to face a new battle readjusting to small-town life in Texas. His wife, his mother, and his friend provide support, but they cannot fully understand the pain and suffering he feels since his tour of duty ended. Lonely, James reconnects with an army buddy, Raymond, who provides him with compassion and friendship during his battle to process his experiences in Iraq. But their reunion also exposes the different ways that war affects people, at least on the surface.

== Cast ==
- Ryan O'Nan as James
- America Ferrera as Sarah
- Wilmer Valderrama as Raymond Gonzales
- Jason Ritter as Michael
- Ethan Suplee as Jack
- Melissa Leo as Martha
- June Diane Raphael as Susie
- Evan Jones as Joe Davis
- Ana Claudia Talancón as Adriana
- Sasha Spielberg as Sally
- Barry Shabaka Henley as Colonel Stephen Evans
- Benito Martinez as David Valdez
- Diego Klattenhoff as Henry
- Misty Upham as Gloria
- Jenny Gabrielle as Tina
- Jeremiah Bitsui as Luis

== Reception ==
On review aggregator Rotten Tomatoes, 67% of 24 critics gave the film a positive review, with a rating average of 5.52/10. Metacritic, which uses a weighted average, assigned the film a score of 47 out of 100, based on 10 critics, indicating "mixed or average" reviews.

Entertainment Weekly gave the film a "B" grade and praised Ryan O'Nan's "quietly riveting performance as an Iraq-war veteran who comes undone after he returns home to dusty Texas (the filmmaker's home turf)".

The film received Imagen Awards nominations for best feature film and for America Ferrera as best actress.
