= X/Y =

- Film poster
- Directed by: Ryan Piers Williams
- Written by: Ryan Piers Williams
- Produced by: America Ferrera; Thomas B. Fore; Jason Michael Berman; Ryan Piers Williams; Kwesi Collisson
- Starring: America Ferrera; Ryan Piers Williams; Melonie Diaz; Jon Paul Phillips; Amber Tamblyn; David Harbour; Common
- Cinematography: Pedro Gómez Millán
- Edited by: Sabine Hoffmann; Sloane Klevin; Marco Perez; Roy Tenhauser
- Music by: Fall On Your Sword
- Production companies: Take Fountain Productions; TideRock Media Films; 5 Productions; MindSmack Productions; Deconstructed Pictures
- Release date: April 19, 2014 (Tribeca Film Festival)
- Running time: 83 minutes
- Country: United States
- Language: English

X/Y is a 2014 American drama film written and directed by Ryan Piers Williams and starring America Ferrera, Ryan Piers Williams, Melonie Diaz, Jon Paul Phillips, Amber Tamblyn, David Harbour, and Common. The film premiered at the Tribeca Film Festival on April 19, 2014.

== Cast ==
- America Ferrera as Silvia
- Ryan Piers Williams as Mark
- Melonie Diaz as Jen
- Jon Paul Phillips as Jake
- Amber Tamblyn as Stacey
- David Harbour as Todd
- Common as Jason
- Danny Deferrari

== Reception ==
On the review aggregator website Rotten Tomatoes, 54% of 13 critics' reviews are positive, with an average rating of 5.5/10.
