= Kilimanjaro (film) =

- Film poster
- Directed by: Walter Strafford
- Written by: Walter Strafford
- Produced by: Jason Michael Berman; Gordon Bijelonic; Kwesi Collisson; Thomas B. Fore; Datari Turner; Ryan Piers Williams
- Starring: Brian Geraghty; Abigail Spencer
- Cinematography: Gavin Kelly
- Edited by: Annette Davey; Todd Feuer
- Music by: Jake Monaco
- Production companies: Deconstructed Pictures; Datari Turner Films; MindSmack.TV; TideRock Films; Untouchable Films
- Release date: March 9, 2013 (South by Southwest)
- Running time: 80 minutes
- Country: United States
- Language: English

Kilimanjaro is a 2013 American independent romantic drama film starring Brian Geraghty and Abigail Spencer.

== Cast ==
- Brian Geraghty as Doug
- Alexia Rasmussen as Clare
- Chris Marquette as Mitch
- Abigail Spencer as Yvonne
- Bruce Altman as Milton Jr.
- Henny Russell as Ellen
- Jim Gaffigan as Bill
- John Cullum as Milton Sr.
- Diego Klattenhoff as Troy

== Reception ==
Mike D'Angelo of The Dissolve awarded the film three stars out of five. Matt Goldberg of Collider gave the film a D rating.
