= Angelina Beloff =

Russian-Mexican artist (1879–1969)

- Ангелина Белова
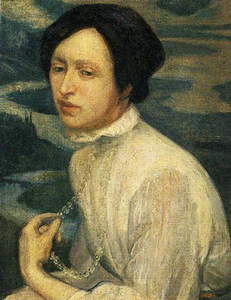
- Portrait of Angelina Beloff by Diego Rivera, 1909
- Born: Angelina Petrovna Belova; June 23, 1879; Saint Petersburg, Russian Empire
- Died: December 30, 1969 (aged 90); Mexico City, Mexico
- Known for: Painting, engraving, puppet theater
- Spouse: Diego Rivera (m. 1911; div. 1921)

Angelina Beloff (born Angelina Petrovna Belova; Russian: Ангелина Петровна Белова; June 23, 1879 – December 30, 1969) was a Russian-born artist who did most of her work in Mexico. However, she is better known as Diego Rivera’s first wife, and her work has been overshadowed by his and that of his later wives. She studied art in Saint Petersburg and then went to begin her art career in Paris in 1909. This same year she met Rivera and married him. In 1921, Rivera returned to Mexico, leaving Beloff behind and divorcing her. She never remarried. In 1932, through her contacts with various Mexican artists, she was sponsored to live and work in the country. She worked as an art teacher, a marionette show creator and had a number of exhibits of her work in the 1950s. Most of her work was done in Mexico, using Mexican imagery, but her artistic style remained European. In 1978, writer Elena Poniatowska wrote a novel based on her life.

== Life ==
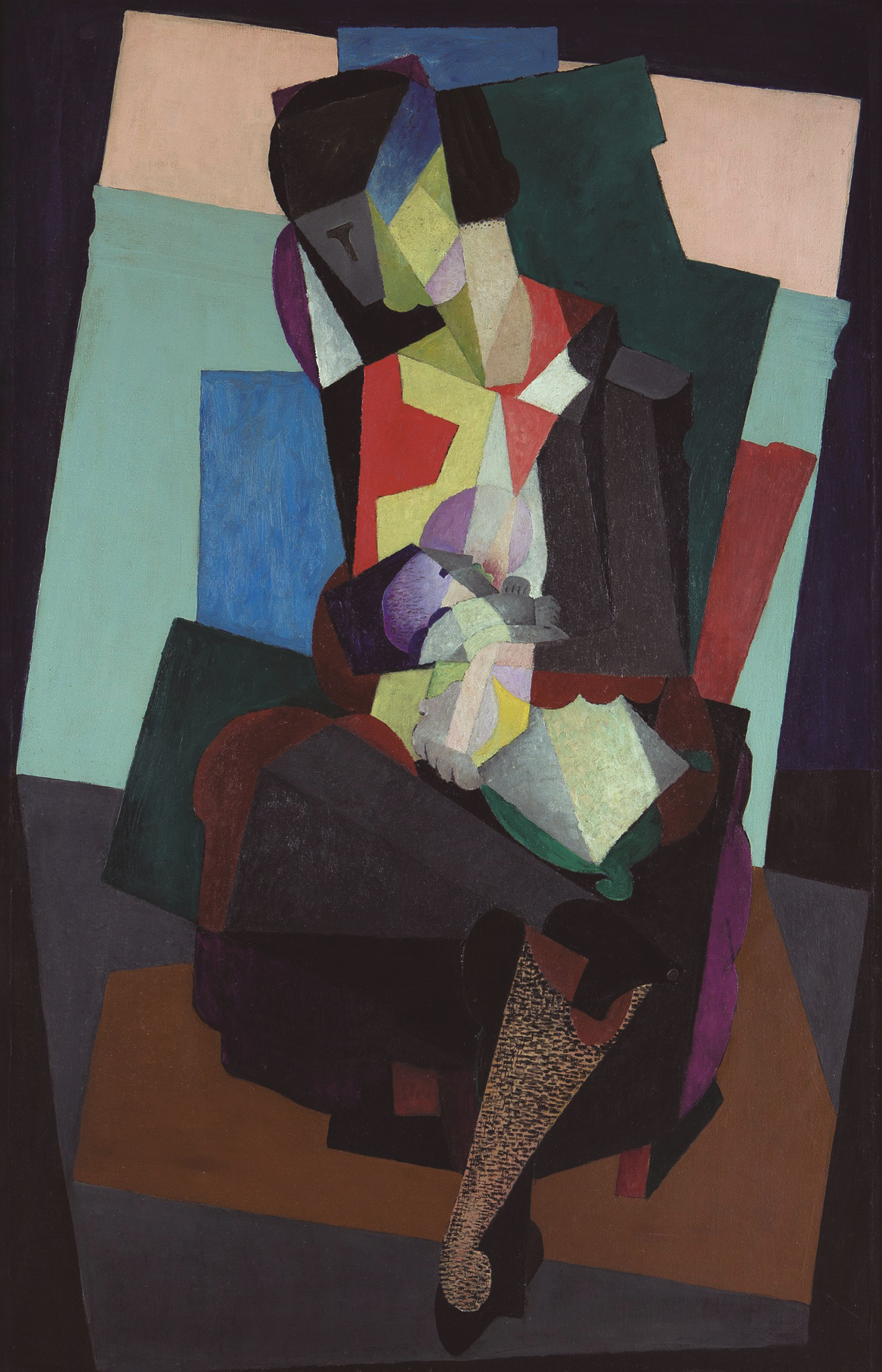
Maternidad, Angelina y el niño Diego (Motherhood, Angelina and the Child Diego), after August 1916, Diego Rivera

Angelina Beloff was born in Saint Petersburg, Russia during the Tsarist period, and raised there by an intellectual family. She entered the St. Petersburg Academy of Arts in 1905 as the city then was the center of Russian art. Beloff's professors encouraged her to move to France to continue studying, which she did after her parents died in 1909. She lived in Paris with support of the Russian government as well as a trust fund from her family, working first in the studio of Henri Matisse and later in the studio of Spanish painter Hermenegildo Anglada Camarasa. During this time, her skills developed, as she learned the printmaking techniques of engraving in both wood and metal and earned recognition for her painting and drawing. She also worked as an art teacher.

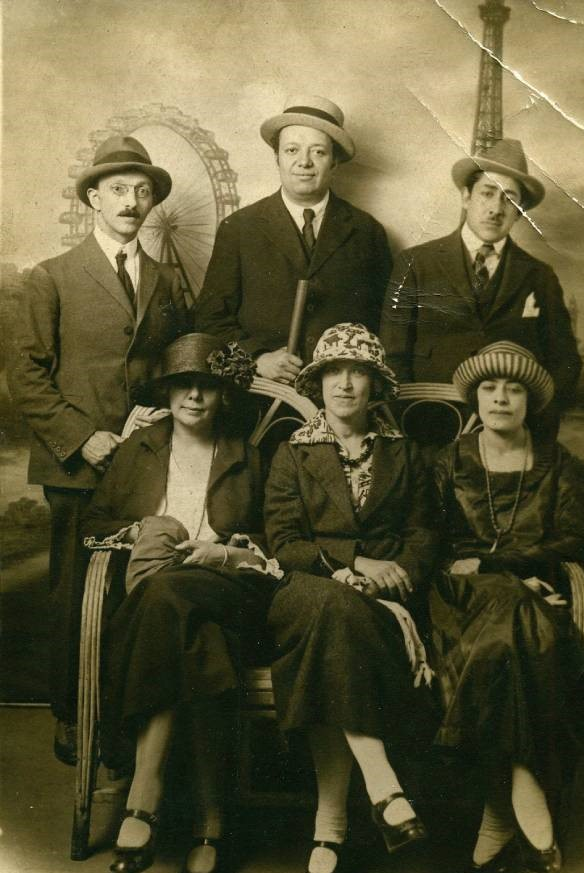
(From left to right, top to bottom) Leon Caillou, Diego Rivera, David Alfaro Siqueiros, Magda Caillou, Beloff, Graciela Amador in Paris, 1920

She went because France was at the vanguard of new painting expression, which had not yet arrived to Russia, (nor Mexico). Thus Paris attracted artists from various countries. She met a number of Mexican artists in France and Belgium, meeting Diego Rivera during a trip with artist María Blanchard to Brussels. Rivera pursued her romantically and were married in Paris by the end of 1909. They had one child named Miguel Ángel, who died of lung complications when he was only fourteen months old. The couple's life in Paris was not easy, economically, especially during the First World War which produced shortages of basic necessities as well as artistic supplies. She worked various jobs, sacrificing her own creative development so that Rivera could paint. She left a diary of her life with Rivera which describes their private life, their exchanges of ideas as painters and collaborative projects, as well as interaction with other painters of their time. Diego was not faithful to her. In 1921, Rivera was called back to Mexico by José Vasconcelos to paint after the Mexican Revolution. Beloff did not accompany him as there was not enough money for both to travel. Rivera never returned to Europe nor decided to reunite with Beloff. He divorced her but continued to send money for her support afterwards. She became reclusive after Rivera married Guadalupe Marín.

The nearly twelve-year relationship created her link to Mexico and brought about her friendships with David Alfaro Siqueiros, Adolfo Best Maugard, Ángel Zárraga, Roberto Montenegro and others. She was invited to come to Mexico to live by Alfonso Reyes and Germán Cueto arriving to Mexico in 1932, when she was 53. While not part of Rivera's social and professional sphere, she had her own, even though that meant she was somewhat marginalized. She said that while she ran into Rivera often living in Mexico City, she never reproached him, only mocked him a little. She lived 37 years in Mexico, pursuing her art career and founding a number of public institutions devoted to the arts. She died in Mexico City on December 30, 1969, at the age of 90.

== Career ==
She worked in oils, watercolors, etchings, photography, graphic arts, puppets, gouaches and drawing creating portraits, landscapes, educational and other illustrations, stages scenes and marionettes. Beloff produced most of her work in Mexico, which was mostly, painting, etching and puppet theater. As a painter her major work was in portraits and watercolors. Her etching and engraving work was mostly for the illustration of books in Europe. She was a master at drawing and created new techniques in etching.

In Europe until 1932, she regularly exhibited at the Tullerías, Independentes and other galleries. While in Paris she painted portraits of various famous Mexicans living there. In Mexico, she exhibited at the Sala de Arte of the Secretaría de Educación Pública, the Galería de Arte Mexicano and the Salón de la Plástica Mexicana in the 1950s.

Most of her engravings, watercolors and oils have gone into public and private collections including those of the Museo de Arte Moderno, the Museo Nacional de Arte and the Blaisten Collection. However, a large number of her works, especially drawing and engravings in metal and wood are part of the collection of the Museo Dolores Olmedo. It is the most important collection of her work as it contains an assortment of drawings, watercolors, graphics and an oil that shows the extent of her talent. The collection was acquired by the museum in 1994, and with the exception of the oil called Tepoztlan, all are from her early career, created in France in the 1910s and 1920s. They include thirty original woodcuts commissioned by the Arthem Fayard publishing house to illustrate the novel Ariane, June fille russe (Ariane, the young Russian girl) by Claude Anet. Other important works are watercolors and dry point to illustrate "To Build a Fire” by Jack London.

She was one of a number of foreign artists invited to Mexico to help shape the country's cultural scene in the decades after the Mexican Revolution. She started working as a drawing and engraving teacher for schools and workshops for the Secretaría de Educación Pública in 1932 and later with the Instituto Nacional de Bellas Artes. Much of her teaching work was related to creating children's theater, especially marionettes, puppets and stage scenery. In the 1930s, SEP supported the creation of marionette and puppet theaters, and Beloff was the main promoter of this work, as it was perceived as a form of teaching students. She created a number of notable marionettes including one called “Pastillita.” She also published Muñecos animados, historia, técnica y función educativa del teatro de muñecos en México y en el mundo in 1945.

She was a member of the Liga de Escritores y Artistas Revolucionarios starting in 1934, the Sociedad Mexicana de Grabadores in 1947, the Galería Espira in the 1930s, the Sociedad para el Impulso de las Arts Plásticas in 1948 and the Salón de las Plástica Mexicana in 1949.

During her life, her work was eclipsed by her relationship with Rivera, along with his other wives, Guadalupe Marín and Frida Kahlo. Her work is virtually unknown in Russia and France, although recognized by a number of academics. There are no major collections in her memory and exhibitions of her work are rare. There was a showing of her work, focusing on her engravings in the 1980s at the Museo Casa Estudio Diego Rivera y Frida Kahlo. In 2012, there was a retrospective of her work at the Museo Mural Diego Rivera with ninety pieces. Even the limited editions books she so meticulously illustrated with her woodcuts are practically unobtainable.

Two books about her life have been published. Elena Poniatowska wrote a novel in 1978 based on Beloff's relationship with Rivera called Querido Diego, te abraza, Quiela, which was adapted for radio, then translated into English as Dear Diego, with Love, Quiela. The focus of Poniatowska's book was solidarity with Beloff and a social criticism of submission to masculine authority. She is not an objective writer but rather an advocate for the artist. Beloff's autobiography, En sus Memorias was published by UNAM in 1986.

== Artistry ==
Her artwork was a fusion of European styles with Mexican imagery and colors, with her main artistic influences being Matisse, Cézanne and Picasso. Her painting shows the most influence from Cézanne, whose work she was introduced to by Rivera. This influence is most seen in still lifes, portraits and a number of landscapes. She avoided Mexican national symbols in her work, preferring to recreate the mundane with focus on details. One work which shows this influence is Avenida Hidalgo vista desde Bellas Artes(1949). Important portraits include Retrato de Susana Díaz de León (1948) which is that of a girl seated on a chair trying to reach the floor with her toes.
