= List of works by Diego Rivera =

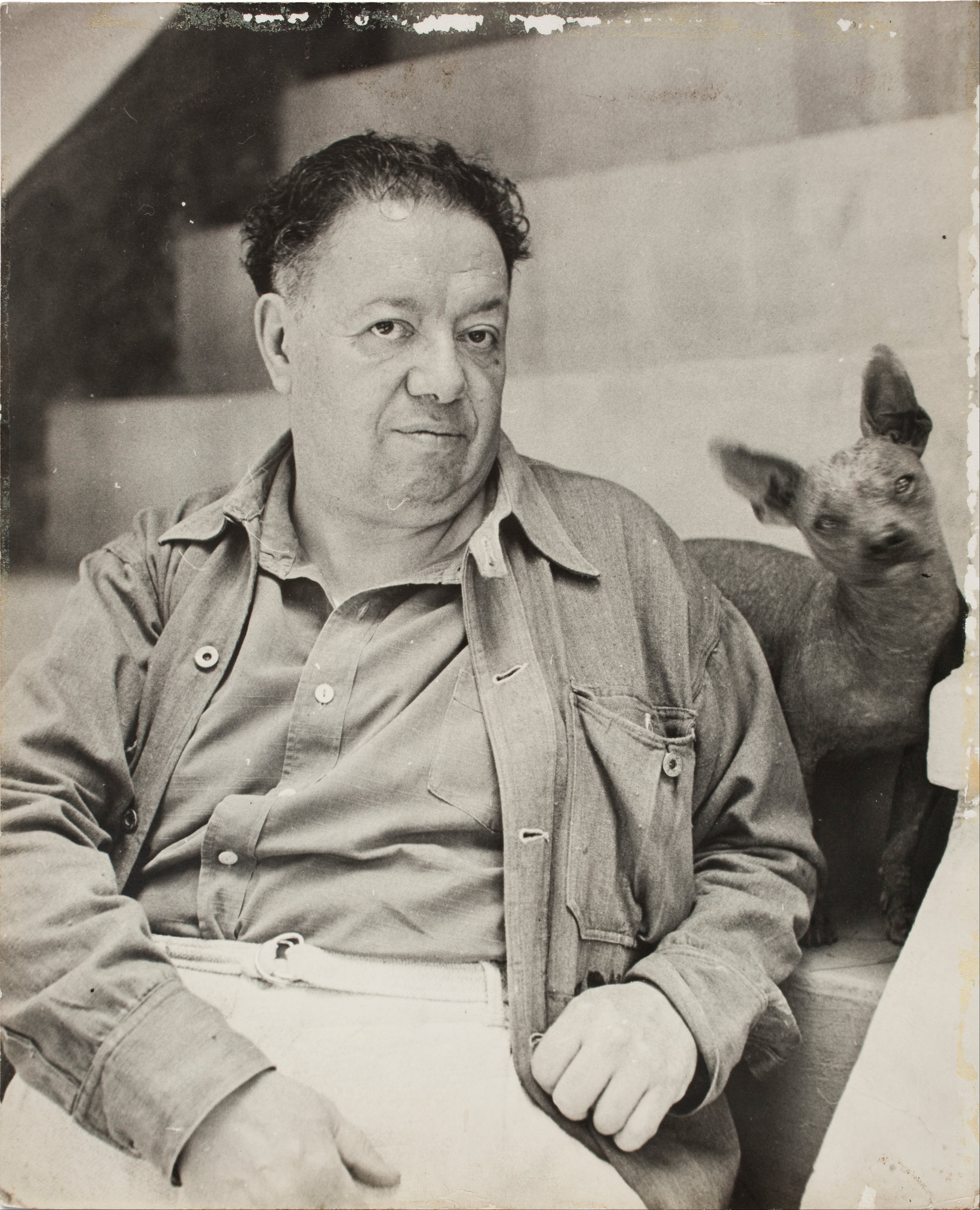
Diego Rivera with Xoloitzcuintle dog

This is a list of works by Diego Rivera (8 December 1886, Guanajuato – 24 November 1957, Mexico City). He was a Modern painter, famous for his social realist murals. This list is split into two distinct era's in Rivera's work, the formative years between 1886 until 1920; and the social realism years between 1921 until his death in 1957.

Rivera is also known for his marriage to Frida Kahlo (6 July 1907, Mexico City – 13 July 1954, Mexico City), also a celebrated Mexican painter.

== Selected Collections ==
- Art Institute of Chicago
- Brooklyn Museum of Art
- Detroit Institute of Arts includes images of Rivera includes images of Rivera
- LACMA
- Metropolitan Museum of Art
- Museo Nacional Centro de Arte Reina Sofía
- Museum of Fine Arts, Houston
- Museum of Modern Art
- National Gallery of Art
- Norton Simon Museum
- Philadelphia Museum of Art
- San Francisco Museum of Modern Art

== Paintings by Rivera ==
=== Formative years (1886–1912) ===
Image	Title (English)	Year	Location	Dimensions (H × W in cm)	Medium
	Classical Head	1898		48.5 × 39.2	
	The Threshing Floor	1904	Museo Casa Diego Rivera, Guanajuato, Mexico	100 × 114.6	
	Head of a Goat	1905	Rafael Coronel Collection, Cuernavaca, Mexico	12.5 × 9.5	
	Night Scene in Avila	1907	Dolores Olmedo Collection, Mexico City		
	Self-Portrait	1907	Dolores Olmedo Collection, Mexico City		
	Avila Morning (The Ambles Valley)	1908	Museo Nacional de Arte (MUNAL), Mexico City	97 × 123	
	Street in Ávila (Ávila Landscape)	1908	Museo Nacional de Arte (MUNAL), Mexico City	129 × 141	
	House over the Bridge	1909	Museo Nacional de Arte (MUNAL), Mexico City	147 × 120	
	Notre Dame de Paris	1909		144 × 113	
	Portrait of Angelina Beloff	1909			
	El Picador	1909	Dolores Olmedo Collection, Mexico City	177 × 133	
	Breton Girl	1910	Museo Casa Diego Rivera, Guanajuato, Mexico	100 × 80	
	Head Of A Breton Woman	1910	Museo Casa Diego Rivera, Guanajuato, Mexico	129 × 141	
	After the Storm (The Grounded Ship)	1910	Museo Nacional de Arte (MUNAL), Mexico City	120.7 × 146.7	
	Landscape	1911			

=== Pre-Cubism (1912–1913) ===
Image	Title (English)	Year	Location	Dimensions (H × W in cm)	Medium
	View Of Toledo	1912		112 × 91	
	Landscape at Toledo	1913	Pinacoteca Diego Rivera, Veracruz, Mexico	32 × 46	
	Portrait Of Oscar Miestchaninoff	1913	Gobierno del Estado de Veracruz, Pinacoteca Diego Rivera, Xalapa, Veracruz, Mexico	147 × 120	
	Portrait Of The Adolfo Best Maugard	1913	Museo Nacional de Arte, Mexico	227.5 × 161.5	
	The Sun Breaking through the Mist	1913	Dolores Olmedo Collection, Mexico City,	83.5 × 59	
	The Adoration Of The Virgin	1913		150 × 120	Oil and encaustic on canvas
	Still Life	1913	Hermitage, St. Petersburg	84 × 65	Tempera on canvas

=== Cubism (1913–1920) ===
Image	Title (English)	Year	Location	Dimensions (H × W in cm)	Medium
	Woman At a Well	1913	Museo Nacional de Arte (MUNAL), Mexico City		
	Chimenea (Chimney)	1913	Foro Valparaíso, Mexico City, México	73 × 59.4	Oil and pencil on canvas
	Portrait of Two Women	1914	Arkansas Arts Center, Little Rock	197.5 × 161.3	Oil on canvas
	La Tour Eiffel	1914		115 × 92	
	The Alarm Clock	1914	Museo Frida Kahlo, Mexico City		
	Sailor at Breakfast	1914		117 × 72	
	Young Man with a Fountain Pen	1914		79.5 × 63.5	
	Portrait of Kawashima and Foujita	1914		78.5 × 74	Oil and collage on canvas
	Zapata-style Landscape	1915	Museo Nacional de Arte, Mexico	145 × 125	
	Seated Woman (Women with the Body of a Guitar)	1915	Museo Frida Kahlo, Mexico City		
	Portrait de Martin Luis Guzman	1915		72.3 × 59.3	
	Portrait of Ramon Gomez de la Serna	1915			
	El Rastro	1915	Dolores Olmedo Collection, Mexico City,	27.5 × 38.5	
	Portrait of Marevna		Art institute of Chicago	145.7 × 112.7	
	Motherhood Angelina and the Child Diego	1916	Museo de Arte Carrillo Gil, Mexico City	134.5 × 88.5	Oil on canvas
	Urban Landscape	1916	Museo Frida Kahlo, Mexico City		
	Still Life with Tulips	1916		67.8 × 53.7	Oil on canvas
	Still Life with Utensils	1917	Dolores Olmedo Collection, Mexico City,	71 × 54	
	La Jarra de Cerveza (The Beer Pitcher)	1917	Foro Valparaíso, Mexico City, México	27 × 22	Oil on canvas

=== Realism (1917–1918) ===
Image	Title (English)	Year	Location	Dimensions (H × W in cm)	Medium
	Knife and Fruit in Front of the Window	1917	Dolores Olmedo Collection, Mexico City,	91.8 × 92.4	
	Still Life with Ricer also known as Still Life with Garlic Press	1918			
	The Outskirts Of Paris	1918			
	The Mathematician	1918	Dolores Olmedo Collection, Mexico City,		

=== Social Realism (1921–1957) ===
Image	Title (English)	Year	Location	Dimensions (H × W in cm)	Medium
	Creation	1922–1923	San Ildefonso College, Mexico City,		Fresco, Gold leaf
	Bather of Tehuantepec	1923		63 × 52	Oil on canvas
	Entry into the Mine	1923	Secretariat of Public Education Main Headquarters, Mexico City	474 × 366	Fresco
	Exit from the Mine	1923	Secretariat of Public Education Main Headquarters, Mexico City		Fresco
	The Embrace	1923	Secretariat of Public Education Main Headquarters, Mexico City		Fresco
	Tehuana Women	1923	Secretariat of Public Education Main Headquarters, Mexico City	476 × 214	Fresco
	The Liberation of The Peon	1923	Secretariat of Public Education Main Headquarters, Mexico City		Fresco
	The New School	1923	Secretariat of Public Education Main Headquarters, Mexico City		Fresco
	Good Friday on the Santa Anita Canal	1923		456 × 356	Fresco
	The Sugar Mill	1923	Secretariat of Public Education Main Headquarters, Mexico City	482 × 366	Fresco
	The Festival of The Distribution of The Land	1923–1924	Secretariat of Public Education Main Headquarters, Mexico City		Fresco
	The Festival of The First of May	1923–1924	Secretariat of Public Education Main Headquarters, Mexico City		Fresco
	The Market	1923–1924	Secretariat of Public Education Main Headquarters, Mexico City		Fresco
	The Maize Festival	1923–1924	Secretariat of Public Education Main Headquarters, Mexico City	438 × 239	Fresco
	The Sacrificial Offering Day of the Dead	1923–1924	Secretariat of Public Education Main Headquarters, Mexico City	415 × 237	Fresco
	Alliance of the Peasant and the Industrial Worker	1924	Chapingo Autonomous University, Texcoco, Mexico		Fresco
	The Day of the Dead	1924	Secretariat of Public Education Main Headquarters, Mexico City		Fresco
	Partition of the Land	1924	Chapingo Autonomous University, Texcoco, Mexico		Fresco
	Dia de Flores (Flower Festival)	1925	Los Angeles County Museum of Art (LACMA)	147.3 × 120.7	Oil on canvas
	The Exploiters	1926	Chapingo Autonomous University, Texcoco, Mexico		Fresco
	The Abundant Earth	1926	Chapingo Autonomous University, Texcoco, Mexico		Fresco
	Revelation of the Way	1926	Chapingo Autonomous University, Texcoco, Mexico		Fresco
	Triumph of the Revolution	1926	Chapingo Autonomous University, Texcoco, Mexico		Fresco
	The Organization of The Agrarian Movement	1926	Chapingo Autonomous University, Texcoco, Mexico		Fresco
	The Mechanization of The Country	1926	Secretariat of Public Education Main Headquarters, Mexico City		Fresco
	The Land's Bounty Rightfully Possessed	1926	Chapingo Autonomous University, Texcoco, Mexico		Fresco
	Indian Boy and Indian Woman with Corn Stalks	1926–27	Chapingo Autonomous University, Texcoco, Mexico		
	Subterranean Forces	1926–27	Chapingo Autonomous University, Texcoco, Mexico		
	Maturation	1926–27	Chapingo Autonomous University, Texcoco, Mexico		
	The Blood of the Revolutionary Martyrs Fertilizing the Earth	1926–27	Chapingo Autonomous University, Texcoco, Mexico	244 × 491	
	The Liberated Earth with The Powers of Nature Controlled by Man	1926–27	Chapingo Autonomous University, Texcoco, Mexico	692 × 598	
	The Perpetual Renewal of the Revolutionary Struggle	1926–27	Chapingo Autonomous University, Texcoco, Mexico	354 × 357	
	Cargadora With Dog	1927			Watercolour
	Death of the Capitalist	1928	Secretariat of Public Education Main Headquarters, Mexico City		
	Night of the Rich	1928	Secretariat of Public Education Main Headquarters, Mexico City		
	Our Bread	1928	Secretariat of Public Education Main Headquarters, Mexico City		
	The Learned	1928	Secretariat of Public Education Main Headquarters, Mexico City		
	The Painter, the Sculptor and the Architect	1923–1928	Secretariat of Public Education Main Headquarters, Mexico City		
	Wall Street Banquet	1928	Secretariat of Public Education Main Headquarters, Mexico City		
	The Arsenal	1928	Courtyard of the Fiestas, Secretariat of Public Education, Mexico City, Mexico		Fresco
	Entering the City	1930	Palace of Cortés, Cuernavaca, Mexico		Fresco
	My Godfather's Sons (Portrait of Modesto and Jesus Sanchez)	1930	Fomento Cultural Banamex, Mexico City		
	Zapata's Horse	1930			
	Conquest and Revolution	1930–31			
	Still Life and Blossoming Almond Trees	1930–31	University of California, Berkeley, Stern Hall, Berkeley, California	265 × 100	Fresco
	Allegory of California	1930–31	The City Club of San Francisco, Stock Exchange Tower, San Francisco, California		Fresco
	Zapata	1930–31	The History of Cuernavaca and Morelos	214 × 89	
	The Making of a Fresco, Showing The Building of a City	1931	San Francisco Art Institute, San Francisco, California		Fresco
	Frozen Assets	1931	Dolores Olmedo Collection, Mexico City	188.5 × 239	
	Blue Boy with the Banana	1931	Norton Simon Museum, Pasadena, California	91.4 × 54.9	Oil on canvas
	Edsel B. Ford	1932	Detroit Institute of Arts, Detroit, Michigan	125.1 × 97.8	
	Detroit Industry, South Wall	1932–1933	Detroit Institute of Arts, Detroit, Michigan		Fresco
	Detroit Industry, North Wall	1933	Detroit Institute of Arts, Detroit, Michigan		Fresco
	Man at the Crossroads / Man, Controller of the Universe	1933–34	Palacio de Bellas Artes, Mexico City		
	The Ancient Indian World	1929–35	Palacio Nacional, Mexico City		
	The World of Today and Tomorrow	1929–35	Palacio Nacional, Mexico City		
	The History of Mexico: From Conquest to the Future (main wall)	1929–35	Palacio Nacional, Mexico City		
	The History of Mexico	1929–35	Palacio Nacional, Mexico City		
	Delfina and Dimas	1935		24 × 31	tempera on masonite
	The Flower Carrier (Flower Carrier)	1935	San Francisco Museum of Modern Art (SFMOMA)	121.9 × 121.3	Oil and tempera on masonite
	The Pinole Seller	1936	Museo Nacional de Arte (MUNAL), Mexico City	81.4 × 60.7	
	Indian Woman Spinning / Indigena Tejiendo	1936	Phoenix Art Museum, Phoenix, Arizona	81.3 × 59.7	
	Carnival of Mexican Life. Dictatorship	1936	Palacio de Bellas Artes, Mexico City		
	Copalli	1937	Brooklyn Museum, Brooklyn, New York City, New York	91.44 × 121.92	
	Portrait of Lupe Marin	1938	Museo de Arte Moderno, Mexico City	171.3 × 122.3	
	Portrait of Dolores Del Rio	1938			
	The Lady in White	1939			
	Portrait of Madesta and Inesita	1939		99 × 69	
	Dancer Resting	1939	Dolores Olmedo Collection, Mexico City	95 × 166	
	Los Vasos Comunicantes (The Communicating Cups)	1939	Foro Valparaíso, Mexico City, México	60 × 84,5	linocut on paper
	Pan American Unity	1940	San Francisco Museum of Modern Art, San Francisco, California (was previously located at City College of San Francisco, Diego Rivera Theater, but moved in 2020)	670 × 2,260	Fresco
	The Hands of Dr. Moore	1940	San Diego Museum of Art, San Diego, California	45.8 × 55.9	
	Portrait of Paulette Goddard	1940–41			
	Self-Portrait Dedicated to Irene Rich	1941	Smith College Museum of Art (SCMA), Northampton, Massachusetts	61 × 43	
	The Flower Seller	1941			
	The Flower Vendor (Girl with Lilies)	1941	Norton Simon Museum, Pasadena, California	121.9 × 121.9	Oil on masonite
	El Vendedor de Alcatraces (Calla Lily Vendor)	1942	Foro Valparaíso, Mexico City, México		
	Portrait of Carlos Pellicer	1942		55 × 43	
	Portrait of Natasha Zakólkowa Gelman	1943		115 × 153	
	Calla Lily Vendor	1943	The Jacques and Natasha Gelman Collection of Mexican Art	150 × 120	Oil on masonite
	Nude with Calla Lilies	1944		157 × 124	
	The Day of the Dead	1944	Museo de Arte Moderno, Mexico City	91 × 73.5	
	The Milliner. Portrait of Henri de Chatillon	1944			
	Portrait of Adalgisa Nery	1945			
	Portrait of Cuca Bustamante	1946	Museo de Arte Moderno, Mexico City,	158 × 122.5	
	Portrait of Mrs Elisa Saldivar de Gutierrez Roldan				
	Portrait of Linda Christian	1947			
	The Temptations of Saint Anthony	1947	Museo Nacional de Arte (MUNAL), Mexico City,	90 × 110	
	Portrait of an Actress	1948			
	Dream of a Sunday Afternoon in Alameda Park	1948	Museo Mural Diego Rivera, Mexico City		
	Retrato de María Félix				
	Portrait of Evangelina Rivas de De la Chica, The lady from Oaxaca	1949			
	Portrait of Senora Dona Evangelina Rivas de LaChica	1949			
	Portrait of Ruth Rivera	1949		199 × 100.5	
	Vendedora de Flores (The Flower Seller)	1949	Museo Nacional Centro de Arte Reina Sofía, Madrid, Spain	180 × 150	Oil on canvas
	Colonisation, 'The Great City of Tenochtitlan'	1945–52	Palacio Nacional, Mexico City,	971 × 492	
	The Huastec Civilisation	1950	Palacio Nacional, Mexico City,		
	The Papermakers	1950	Palacio Nacional, Mexico City,		
	Totonac Civilization	1950	Palacio Nacional, Mexico City,		
	Pre-Hispanic America	1950			
	Figure Symbolizing the African Race	1951			
	Figure Symbolizing the Asiatic Race	1951			
	The Hands of Nature Offering Water	1951			
	Portrait of the Young Girl Elenita Carrillo Flores	1952		55 × 105	
	The Banana Leaf Loader	1953		50 × 40	
	The History of Medicine in Mexico: The People's Demand for Better Health	1953			
	Portrait of Sra. Dona Elena Flores de Carrillo	1953		140 × 221.5	
	The Painter's Studio	1954		150 × 178	
	Evening Twilight at Acapulco	1956		30 × 40	
	Portrait of Silvia Pinal	1956			
	The Hammock	1956			
	May Day Procession in Moscow	1956		135.2 × 108.3	
	Lenin in 1922	Unknown			
	Sugar Plantation, Tealtenango, Morelos and Indian Slaves in the Gold Mines	Unknown			
	The Architect, Jesus T. Acevedo	Unknown	Museo de Arte Carrillo Gil, Mexico City		
	Portrait of Marevna	Unknown			
