= National Palace (Mexico) =

Palace in Mexico City

- Palacio Nacional (Spanish)
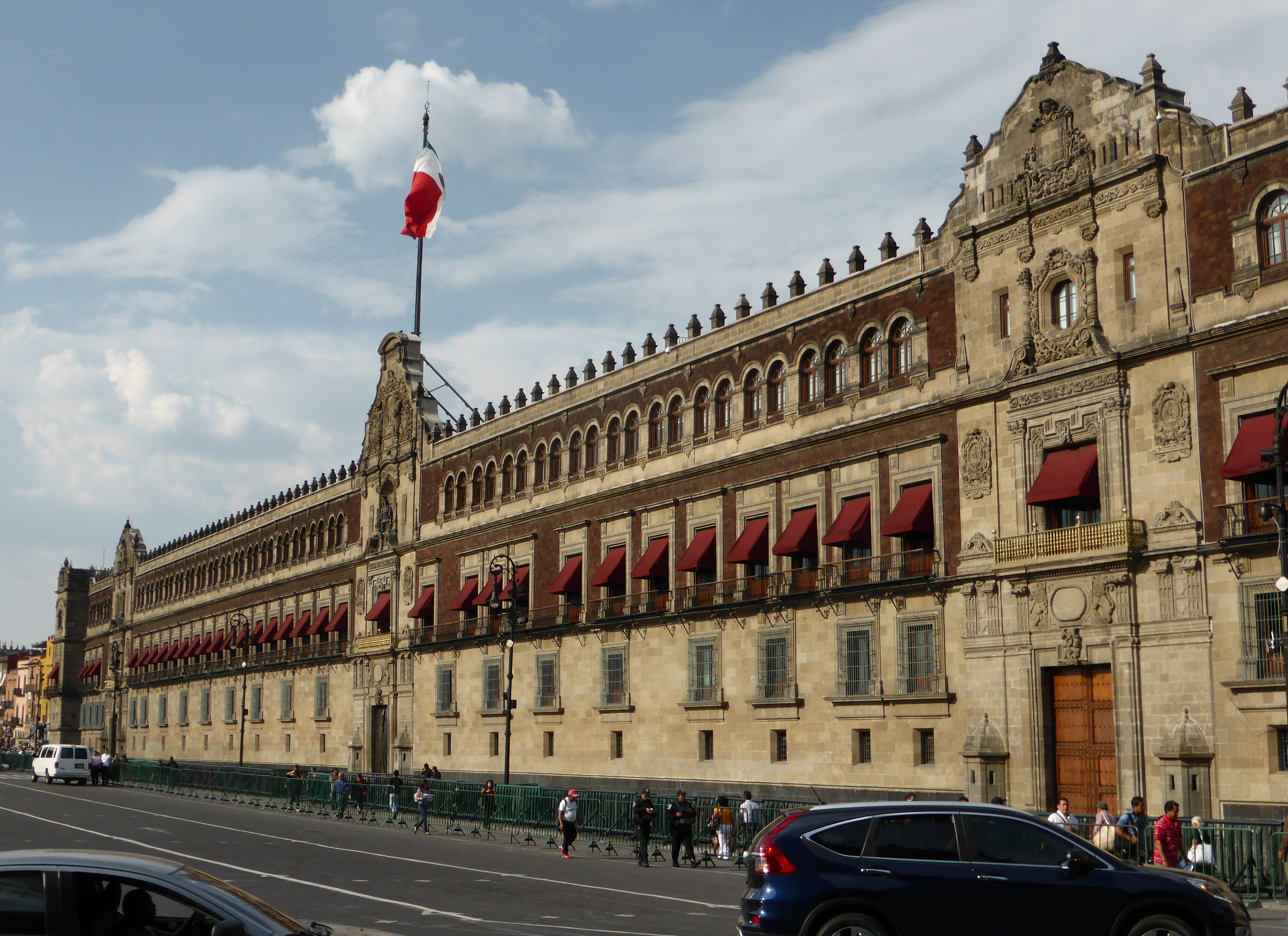
- The National Palace in Mexico City
- Former names: Palace of the Viceroy; Palacio Imperial

General information
- Architectural style: Baroque
- Location: Mexico City, Mexico
- Construction started: 1522

The National Palace (Spanish: Palacio Nacional) is the seat of the federal executive in Mexico. Since 2018 it has also served as the official residence for the President of Mexico. It is located on Mexico City's main square, the Plaza de la Constitución ("Zócalo"). This site has been a palace for the ruling class of Mexico since the Aztec Empire, and much of the current palace's building materials are from the original one that belonged to the 16th-century leader Moctezuma II.

== Description ==
Used and classified as a government building, the National Palace, with its red tezontle facade, fills the entire east side of the Zócalo, measuring over 200 metres (660 ft) long. It is home to some of the offices of both the Federal Treasury and the National Archives.

The facade is bordered on the north and south by two towers and includes three main doorways, each of which lead to a different part of the building. The southern door leads to the Patio of Honor and presidential offices (no public access). The northern door is known as the Mariana Door, named in honor of Mariano Arista who had it constructed in 1850. The area next to this door used to be the old Court Prison, with courtrooms and torture chambers. It is now occupied by the Finance Ministry. It contains the Treasury Room, constructed by architects Manuel Ortiz Monasterio and Vicente Mendiola. The iron and bronze door is the work of Augusto Petriccioli.

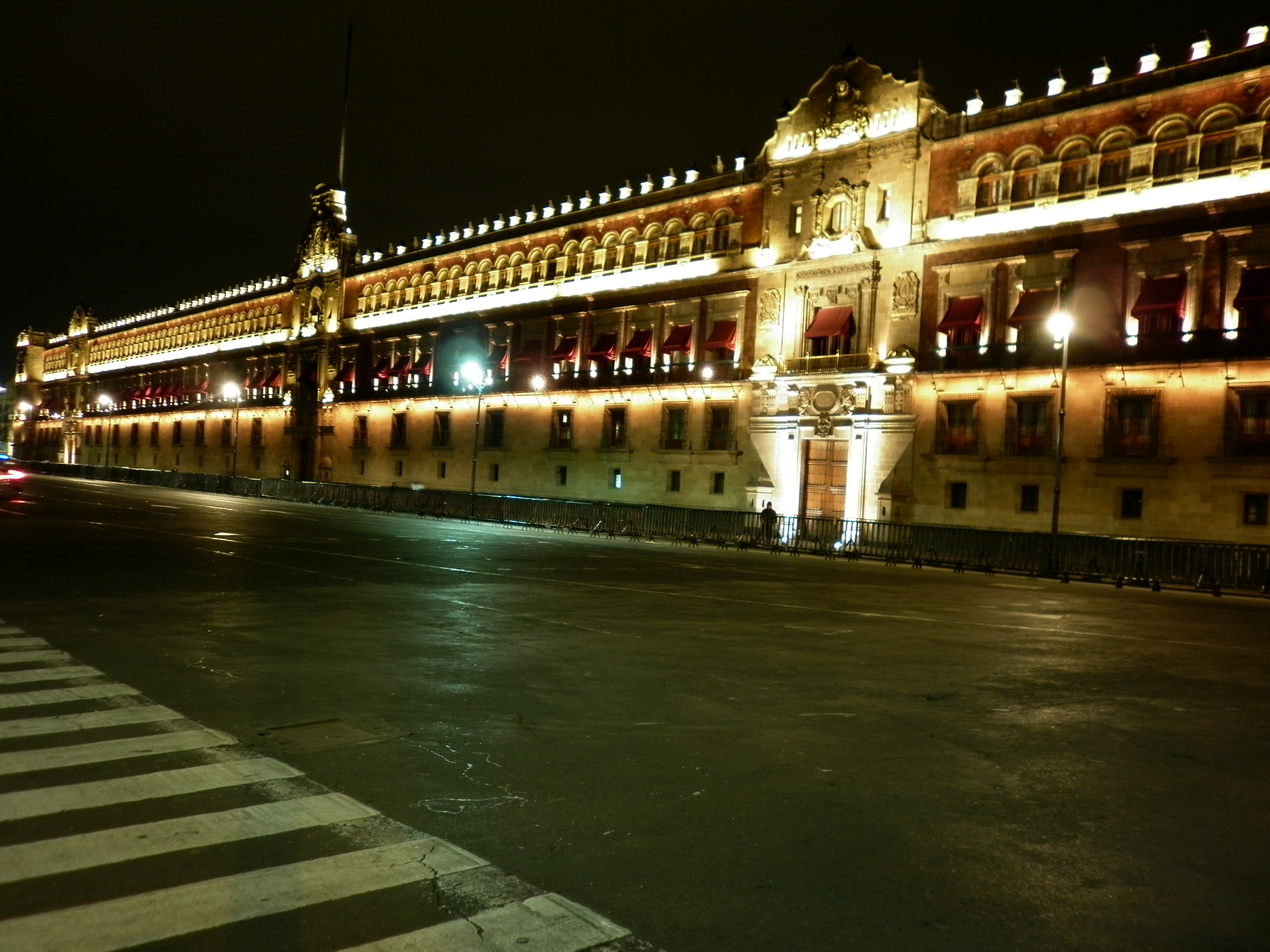
The National Palace at night

Above the central doorway, facing the Zócalo, is the main balcony where just before 11pm on September 15, the president of Mexico gives the Grito de Dolores, in a ceremony to commemorate Mexican Independence. Part of this ceremony includes ringing the bell that hangs above the balcony. This bell is the original one that Father Miguel Hidalgo rang to call for rebellion against Spain. It originally hung in the church of Dolores Hidalgo, Guanajuato, but was relocated here. In the niche containing the bell, there is the Mexican coat of arms. On each side there is an Aztec eagle knight and his Spanish counterpart. These were sculpted by Manuel Centurion and symbolize the synthesis of Mexican culture and Spanish culture.

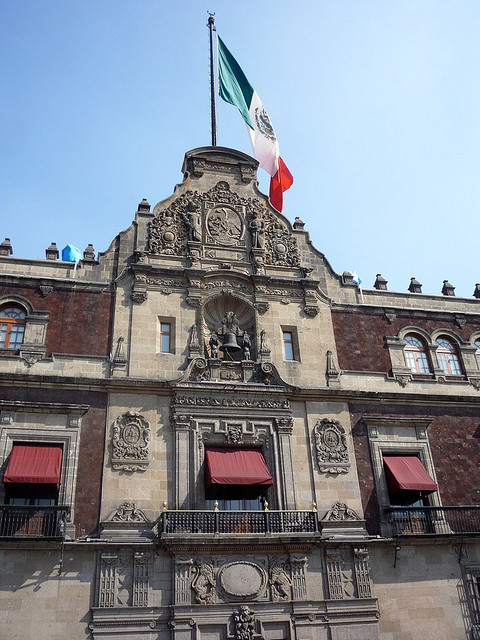
Balcony where the president of Mexico gives the annual Grito de Dolores on Independence Day and the bell from the church in Dolores Hidalgo, Guanajuato

The central door leads to the main patio which is surrounded by Baroque arches. Only the balustrade of this area has been remodeled, conserving the murals by Diego Rivera that adorn the main stairwell and the walls of the second floor. In the stairwell is a mural depicting the history of Mexico from 1521 to 1930, and covers an area of 450 m^{2} (4800 ft^{2}). These murals were painted between 1929 and 1935, jointly titled "The Epic of the Mexican People". The work is divided like a triptych with each being somewhat autonomous. The right-hand wall contains murals depicting pre-Hispanic Mexico and centers around the life of the Aztec god Quetzalcóatl. Quetzalcóatl appears in the mural as a star, a god, and a human being. Created by serpents, he sails through space as a star that accompanies the sun at night. Quetzalcóatl then assumes a human body to teach the Aztec people as their king and patriarch. Last, when he sacrifices his blood to give life to men, he returns to the sky having completed his earthly cycle. Once he leaves the earth, Quetzalcóatl assumes the shape the morning star, called Tlahuizcalpantecuhtli. The cycle that he undergoes signifies the continuous cycle of life. Rivera's creation of a Mexican identity helps to continue the reform that began with the Mexican Revolution of 1910. Before this time, any individualism from the Indians was discouraged as well as any allusion toward Aztec origins. The mural aims to dismiss any idea of inferiority.

In the middle and largest panel, the Conquest is depicted with its ugliness, such as rape and torture, as well as priests defending the rights of the indigenous people. The battle for independence occupies the uppermost part of this panel in the arch. The American and French invasions are represented below this, as well as the Reform period and the Revolution. The left-hand panel is dedicated to early and mid-20th century, criticizing the status quo and depicting a Marxist kind of utopia, featuring the persons of Plutarco Elías Calles, John D. Rockefeller, Harry Sinclair, William Durant, J.P. Morgan, Cornelius Vanderbilt and Andrew Mellon as well as Karl Marx. This part of the mural also includes Frida Kahlo, Diego's wife. This mural reflects Diego's own personal views about Mexico's history and the indigenous people of the country in particular.

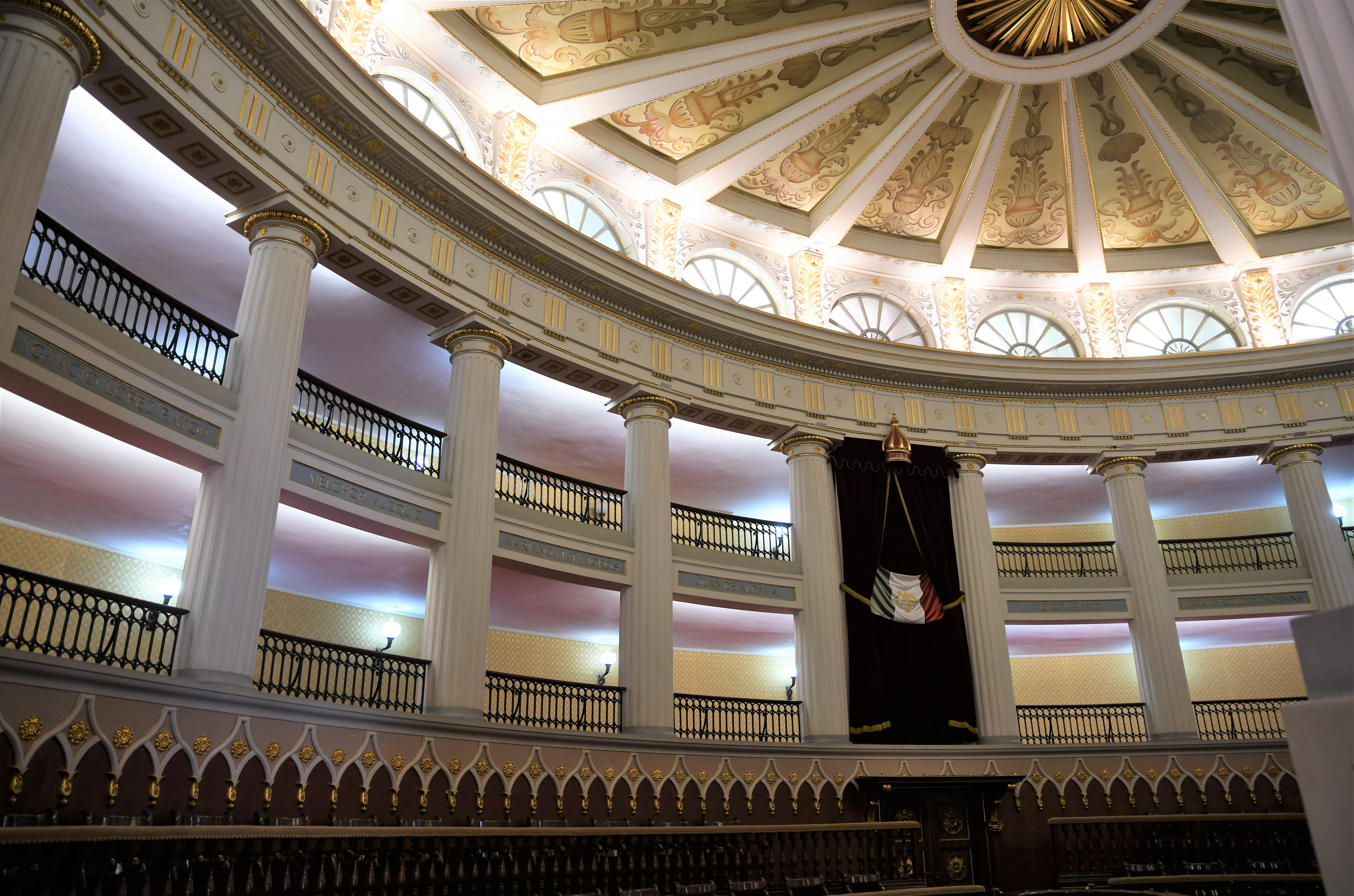
The hall that hosted the Chamber of Deputies from 1829 to 1872

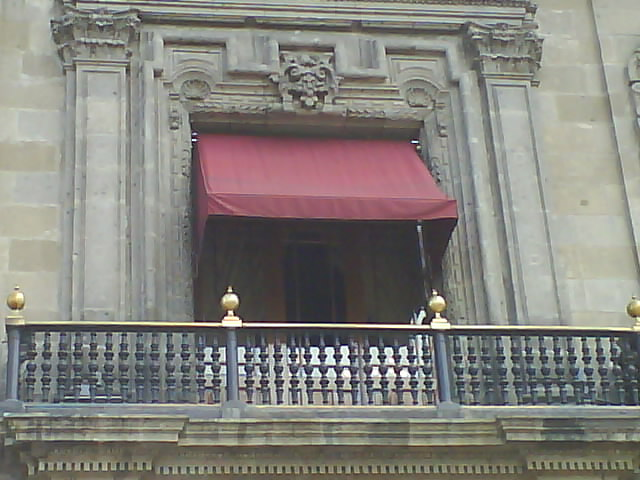
Center balcony of the National Palace

Diego also painted 11 panels on the middle floor, such as the "Tianguis of Tlatelolco" (tianguis means "market"), and the "Arrival of Hernán Cortés in Veracruz". These are part of a series depicting the pre-Hispanic era. Peoples such as the Tarascos of Michoacán, the Zapotecs and Mixtecs of Oaxaca and the Huastecs of Hidalgo, San Luis Potosí and Veracruz. However, this series was not finished.

On the upper floor is what once was the Theatre Room of the viceroys, which became the Chamber of Deputies from 1829 to August 22, 1872, when the room was accidentally destroyed by fire. In this parliamentary chamber the Reform Constitution of 1857 was written. This and the Constitution of 1917 are on display.

The Palace has fourteen courtyards but only a few of these, such as the Grand Courtyard beyond the central portal, are open to the public. The National Palace also houses the main State Archives, with many historical documents, and the Biblioteca Miguel Lerdo de Tejada, one of the largest and most important libraries in the country.

On north annex of the building is the Treasury Room and the Benito Juárez Museum. Between the two is the Empress Stairway, built by brothers Juan and Ramón Agea. When faced with claims that their work was unstable and would collapse, they had a full battalion charge down them while they stood underneath. The Treasury Room is no longer in use. Leading to the Museum part of the complex, which used to be the Finance Ministry, is a statue of Benito Juárez by Miguel Noreña. This work was criticized at the time because it was felt that such an honored person should not be depicted sitting on his coattails, as it was contrary to social etiquette at the time. In the Finance Ministry patio is the Benito Juárez Room, where this president lived during the end of his term and where he died on July 18, 1872. The bedroom, living room and study have been preserved complete with a number of objects belonging to the president.

== History of the building ==
=== Moctezuma's "New Houses" ===
The site and much of the building material of the current building is of what were called Moctezuma II's "New Houses". This palace functioned as the Aztec tlatoani's residence and performed a number of official functions as well. The building was divided into two sections and decorated with marble and painted stucco. The main façade contained the shield of the monarchy, an eagle with a snake in its claws. It has three patios surrounded by porticos, indoor sanitary facilities, fountains and gardens. The bedrooms had tapestries of cotton, feathers and rabbit fur painted in bright colors. The floors were of polished stucco and covered in animal furs and finely-woven mats. There were rooms for servants, administrative staff, and military guards, along with kitchens, pantries and storage rooms. The richness of the palace surprised Cortés, which he relayed in letters to Charles I of Spain.

The palace also held a chamber reserved for the "tlacxitlan" where a group of elders, presided over by the emperor himself, would settle disputes among the citizenry. After the Conquest, these New Houses were not completely leveled to the ground but were sufficiently destroyed as to make them uninhabitable.

=== Cortés's palace ===
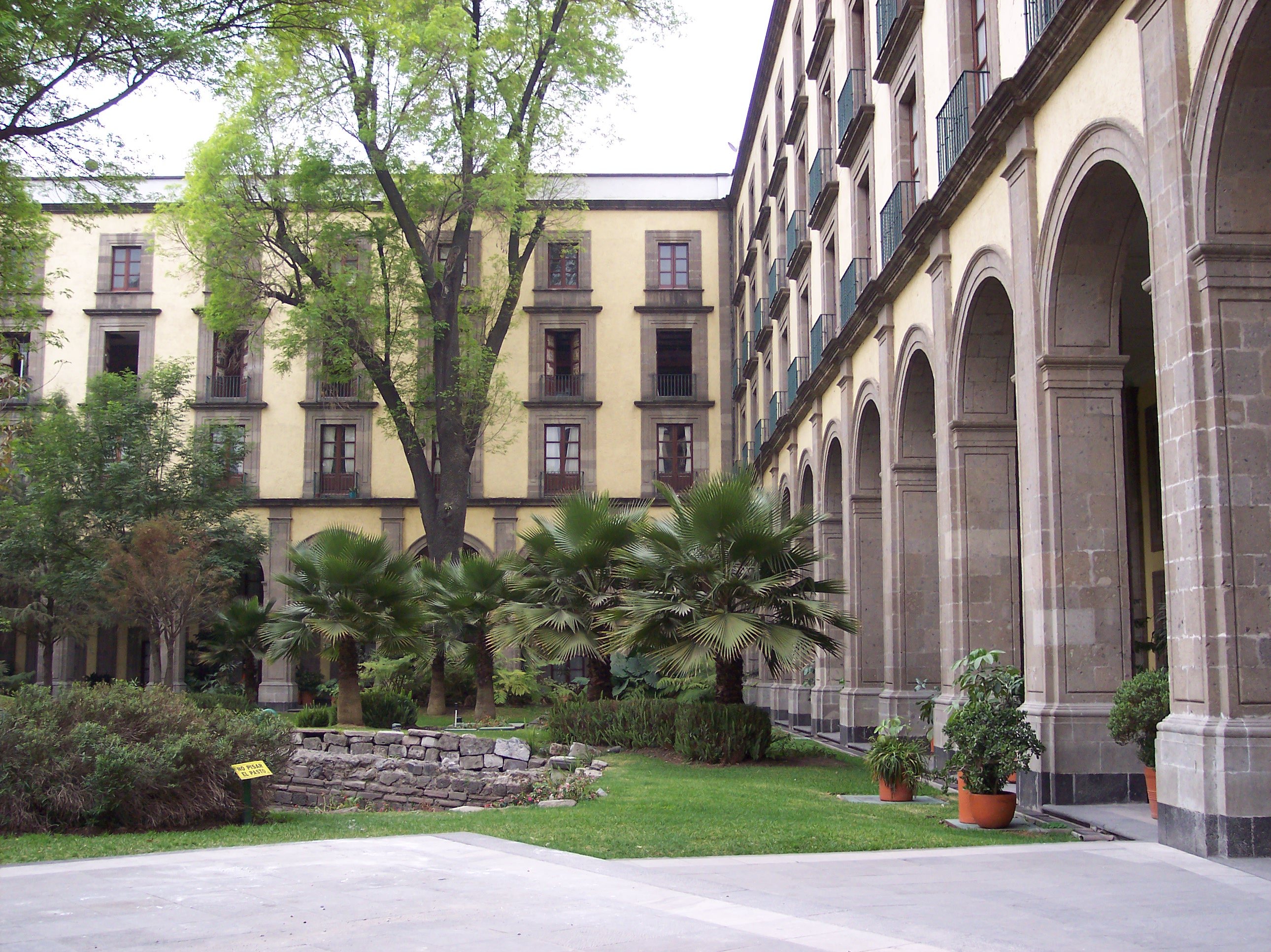
Palacio Nacional garden

The land and the buildings on it were claimed by Hernán Cortés, who had architects Rodrigo de Pontocillos and Juan Rodríguez rebuild the palace while Cortés lived in the "Old Houses" (now the Nacional Monte de Piedad building) across the plaza from 1521 to 1530.

Cortés's palace was a massive fortress with embrasures for cannon at the corners and the mezzanine had crenels for musketeers. The façade had only two doors with arches (medio punto). Inside there were two patios, with a third being built after 1554 and a fourth sometime after that. Its garden was extensive, occupying much of the south and southwest portions of the property up to what is now Correo Mayor Street. The palace has living quarters, offices, two audience rooms, and a tower for gunpowder. A secondary building behind the main one has nineteen windows spanning its façade. It also had a parapet, above which was a clock and a bell. The main courtyard was built large enough so he could entertain visitors with New Spain's first recorded bullfights.

The Spanish crown bought the palace from the Cortés family in 1562 to house the Viceregal Palace. It remained so until Mexican Independence in the 1820s.

=== Viceregal palace ===
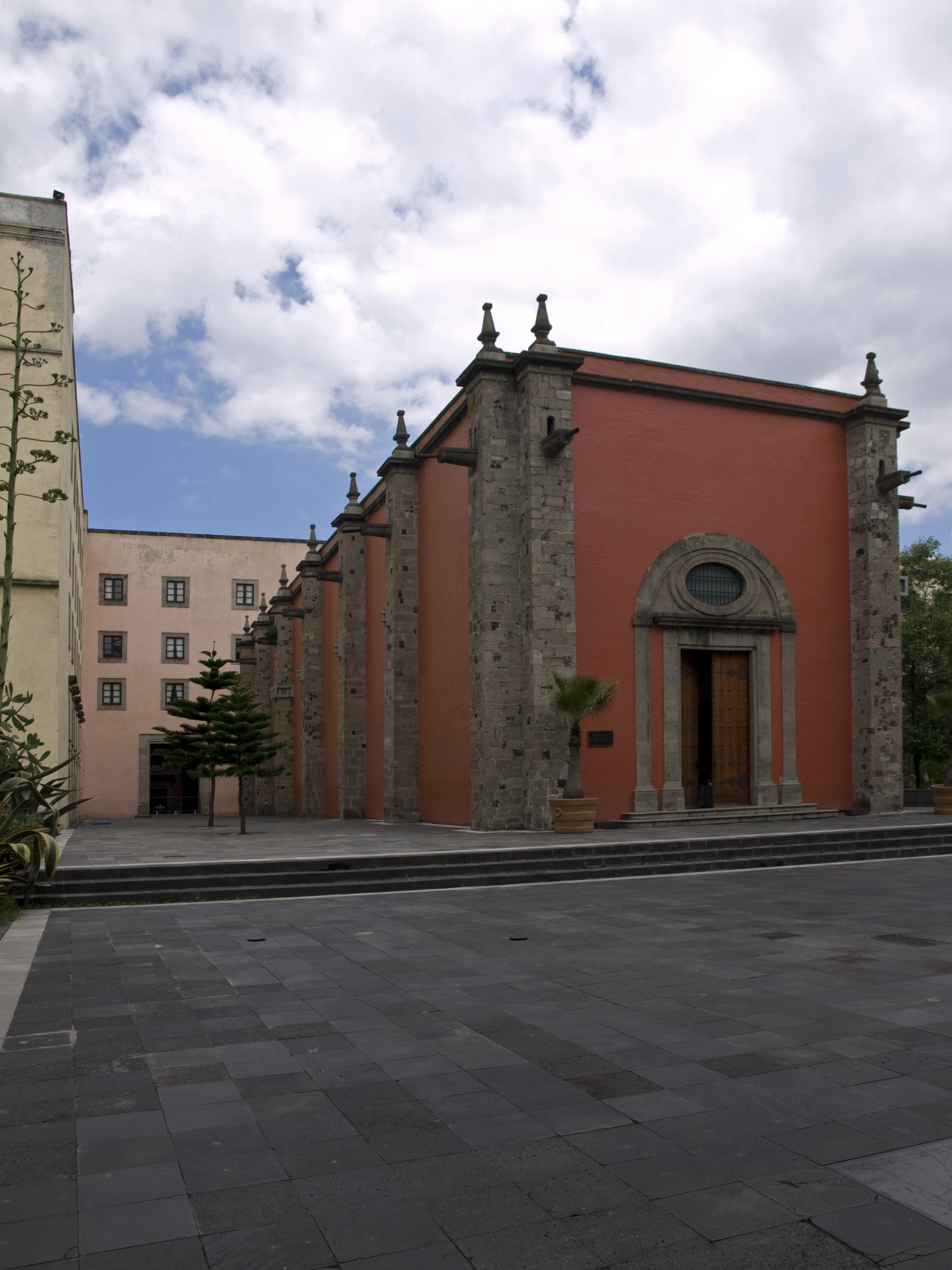
The Royal Chapel

In 1562, the Spanish Crown bought the palace and land from Martin Cortés, son of Hernán Cortés, retaining much of the Cortés palace features. It was known as the Palacio del Virrey (Palace of the Viceroy) or Casa Real de los Virreyes (Royal House of the Viceroys).

Italian Capuchin friar Ilarione da Bergamo included a description of the viceregal palace in his travel narrative. He notes that the building is not just the residence of the viceroy and his family, but also has a number of government offices including the high court (Real Audiencia) and other legal offices, royal treasury agents, attorneys including those of the General Indian Court, as well as small prisons in the complex. During the tenure of viceroy Bernardo Gálvez, he sought a residence separate from the palace and plans for Chapultepec Castle were drawn up in 1785, to be constructed on a high point outside the core of the city.

The palace was the site of viceregal power and centrally located so that when there were outbreaks of violence toward the regime, the palace was a target. Due to tensions between the viceroy and the archbishop, the palace was set on fire by supporters of the archbishop in 1624. On 8 June 1692, the palace was almost completely destroyed. Viceroy Gaspar de Sandoval then had Friar Diego Valverde reconstruct the palace. Historian Manuel Rivera Cambas states that after reconstruction, the palace lost its fortress-like appearance, and took on a Baroque appearance. Its crenels were converted into windows with ironwork grilles. framed in stonework. Inscriptions were etched above these windows and coats-of-arms were places to the sides. A smaller, third door was added on the north side of the building. On the inner, secondary building, tall windows with small ironwork balconies were installed. The south door led to what was named the "Patio of Honor"; in this section were the viceroy's quarters. The mezzanine held the offices of the Secretary and the Archives of the Viceroyalty. The lower part has servants' and halberdiers' quarters as well as storage bins for mercury. This Patio of Honor opened in back toward a garden for the use of the viceroy and his court. The north door led to a small patio in which was located the jail and the guards' quarters. When the Royal Botanical Expedition to New Spain was at work in Mexico (1787-1803), the establishment of the Royal Botanical Garden on the model of that in the imperial capital of Madrid was an essential mandate of the enterprise. The viceregal palace itself became a site of the botanical garden, with excavations of the original site done so that fertile soil could be substituted. The palace essentially remained unchanged until after independence in the 1830s.

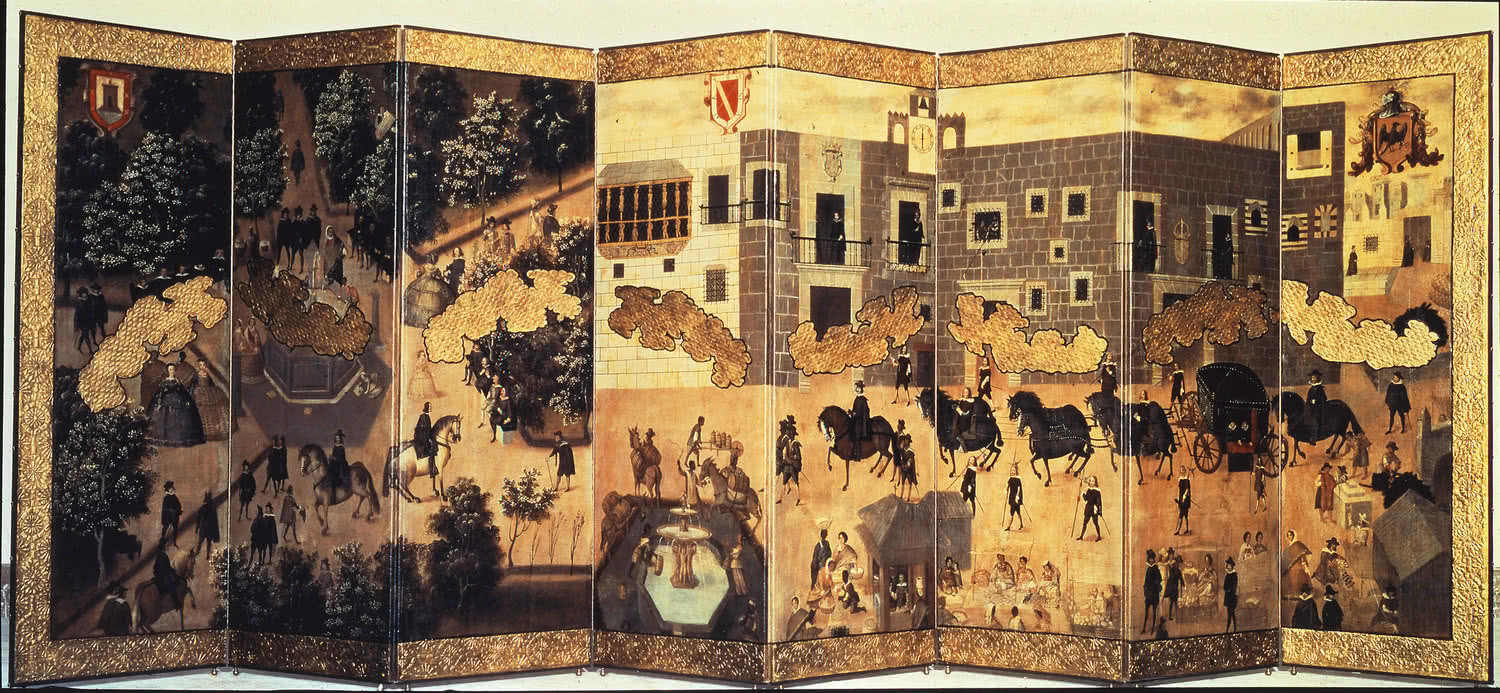
Views of the Alameda and the Palace of the Viceroys of Mexico (before the 1711 reconstruction) (today the National Palace), anonymous painter, c. 1676, Mexico City. Museum of the Americas, Madrid

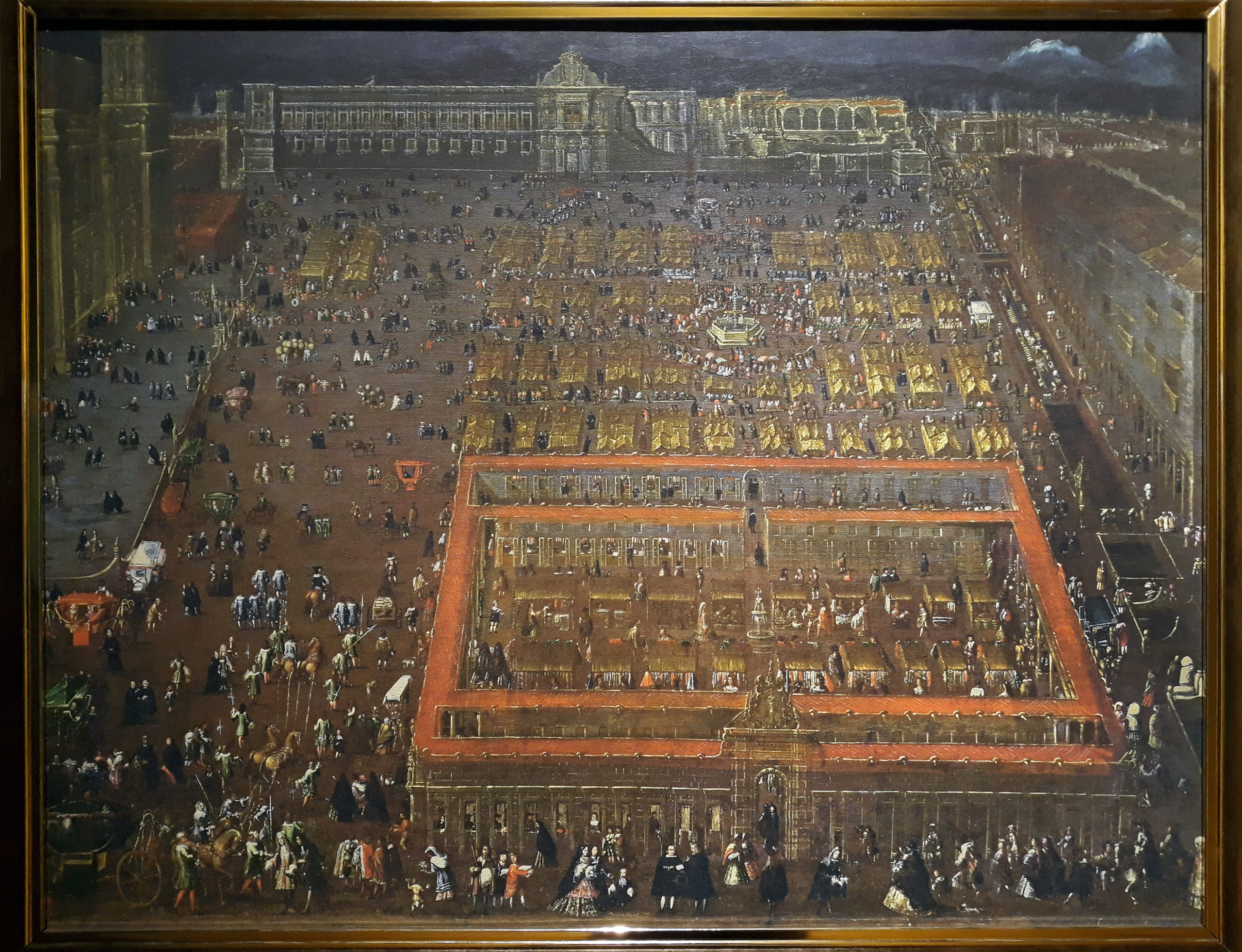
View of the Plaza Mayor (today Zócalo) in Mexico City (ca. 1695) by Cristóbal de Villalpando. The work shows the Viceroy's Palace still ruined by the 1692 riot in Mexico City. Corsham Court, England

=== After independence ===
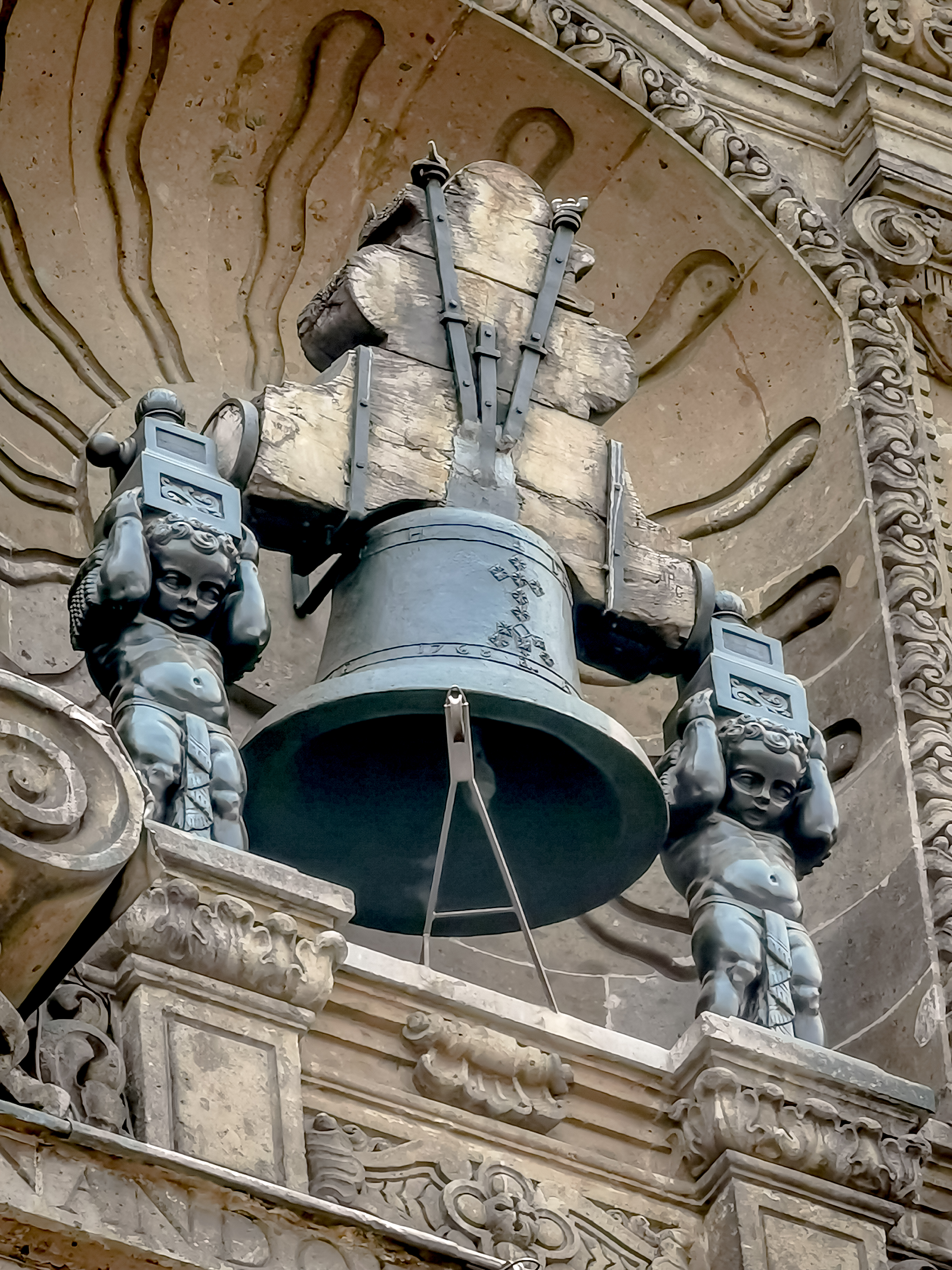
Original bell used by Miguel Hidalgo at dawn on 16 September 1810, in the so-called Grito de Dolores, was transferred from Dolores Hidalgo in 1896 by order of President Porfirio Díaz. The niche and sculptures around it was reconstructed between 1926-1930s.

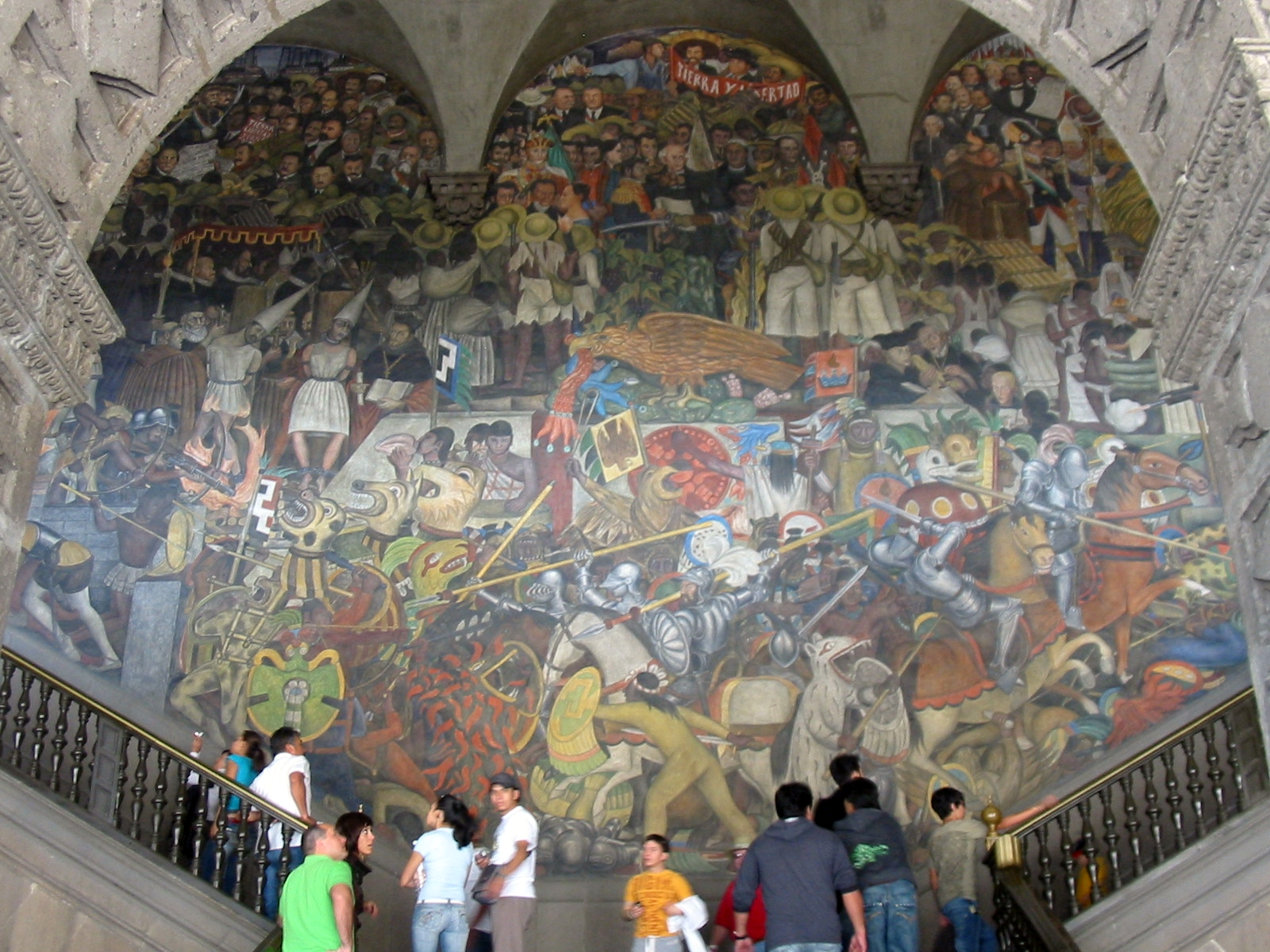
Part of Diego Rivera's mural depicting Mexico's history in the main stairwell.

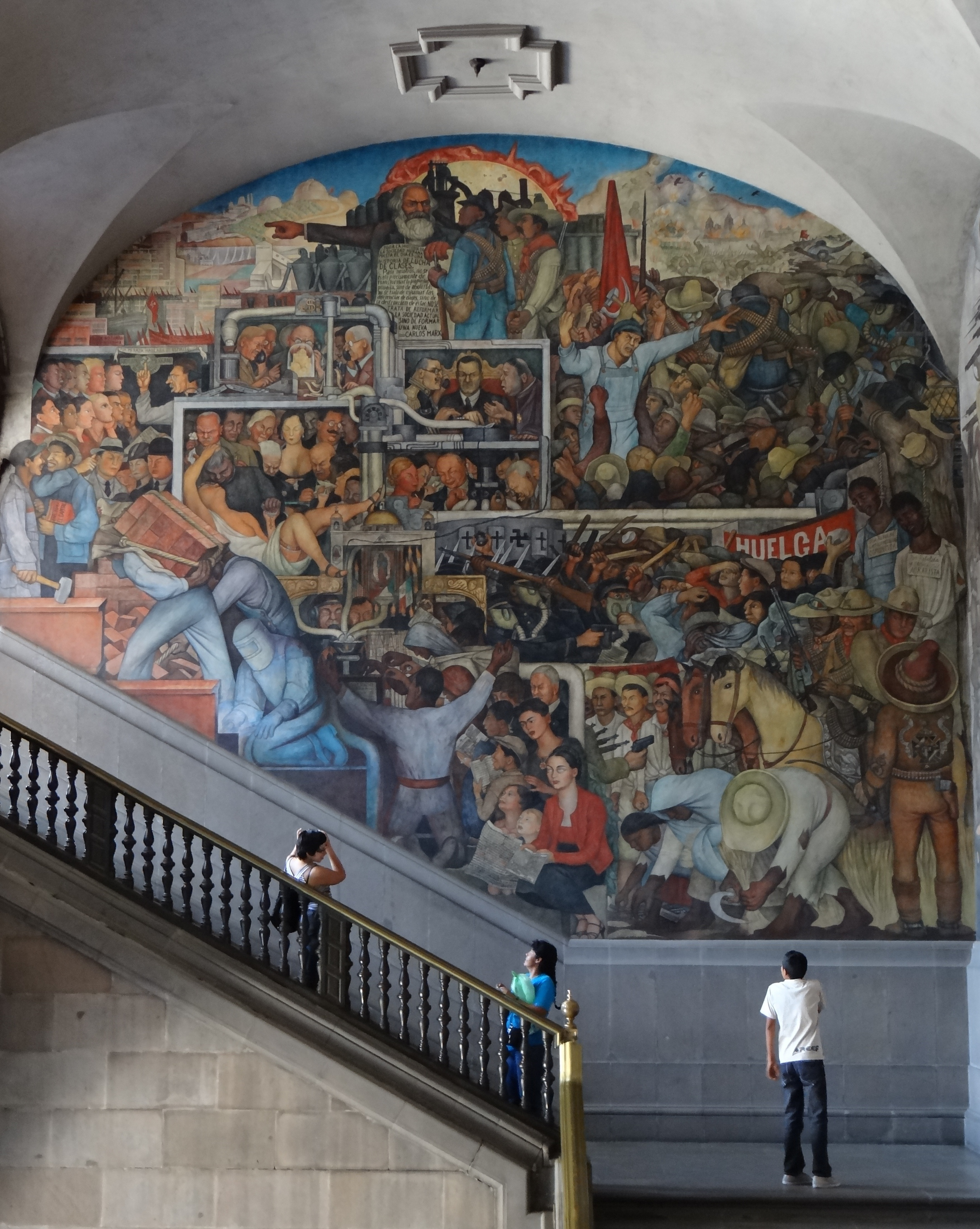
Left panel of Rivera's History of Mexico mural in the main stairwell.

Many of Mexico's leaders after independence made changes to the Viceroy Palace, including renaming it the "National Palace". Mexico's first ministries were installed such as the Ministry of Hacienda (internal revenue), Ministry of War, Ministry of Justice, and the Ministry of Internal and External Relations, as well as the Supreme Court. During an uprising led by Valentín Gómez Farías against then-president Anastasio Bustamante, the southwest balustrade was seriously damaged during a siege lasting twelve days. In 1845, the old Chambers of Deputies was constructed, with the Senate on the upper floor of the south wing. In 1850, Mariano Arista had the old north prison door cemented shut and constructed the current northern door. He also converted the north wing into barracks of the "Batallón de Guardia de Supremos Poderes" (Battalion of Guards for the Supreme Powers). In 1864, Maximilian of Habsburg had three flagpoles installed in front of the three main doors. By the central door was the Mexican flag; at the north door was the flag of Austria and at the south door was the flag of France. He also had Lorenzo de la Hidalga construct the grand marble staircase that is in the Patio of Honor in the southern wing, as well as having the public rooms roofed and furnished with paintings, candelabras, and chamber pots from Hollenbach, Austria and Sirres, France. In opposition, Benito Juárez chose to have his quarters in the north end of the Palace, rather than in the traditional southern end.

In 1877, the Secretaría de Hacienda y Credito Público (Secretary of Internal Revenue and Public Credit), José Ives Limantour, as part of his overhaul of the department, moved their offices to the north wing, finishing in 1902. He chose the largest room in the wing for the Office of Seals. In 1896, the bell that Father Hidalgo rung at the parish of Dolores, Guanajuato was moved here.

A number of changes were made during the rule of Porfirio Díaz. The English-made clock on the parapet was moved to the tower of the Church of Santo Domingo. The façade was cemented over and etched to look like stone block. Cloth awnings were placed on the windows of the upper floors. On pedestals near the main door, statues of female forms were placed. Inside, the ambassador's room, the dining room, the kitchens, the lounge, the garages and the stables were all refurnished. This was done at a time when French style was popular in Mexico.

Between 1926 and 1929, the third floor was added during the term of President Plutarco Elías Calles by Alberto J. Pani, an engineer and then finance minister and designed by Augusto Petriccioli. Merlons were placed on the towers and parapet and decorative caps were placed on all three doors. The Dolores Bell was placed in a niche flanked by atlantes above the balcony above the central door. The façade was covered with red tezontle stone and installed stone frames on the doors, windows, cornices, and parapets. In the interior, a grand staircase of marble was installed in the central patio (where Diego Rivera would later paint The History of Mexico mural) and constructed stairs to the internal revenue department and the offices of the General Treasury in the north wing. The old Chamber of Deputies, abandoned after a fire in 1872, was reconstructed and re-inaugurated as a museum to the centennial. A statue of Benito Juárez was placed in the north wing near his old quarters. This statue was made with bronze from the cannons of the Conservative Army during the Reform War and from French projectiles from the Battle of Puebla. This caused the Palace to give it the appearance it has today.

=== Palace as presidential residence ===
All the viceroys that ruled New Spain during the colonial period lived in this residence except for Antonio de Mendoza and Juan O’Donojú, the first and last viceroys. After independence, the palace was home to the two emperors who ruled Mexico during brief periods: Agustin de Iturbide and Maximilian I of Mexico. The first president to live in the building was also Mexico's first president, Guadalupe Victoria, and its last occupant in the 19th century was Manuel González, president from 1880 to 1884. After that, the presidential residence was moved to Chapultepec Castle and later, in 1934, to Los Pinos, but the National Palace became the official residence once again with Andrés Manuel López Obrador, president since 2018. Famous people who stayed here include Sor Juana Inés de la Cruz, Mateo Alemán, Friar Servando de Mier (he also died here), Alexander von Humboldt and Simón Bolívar.

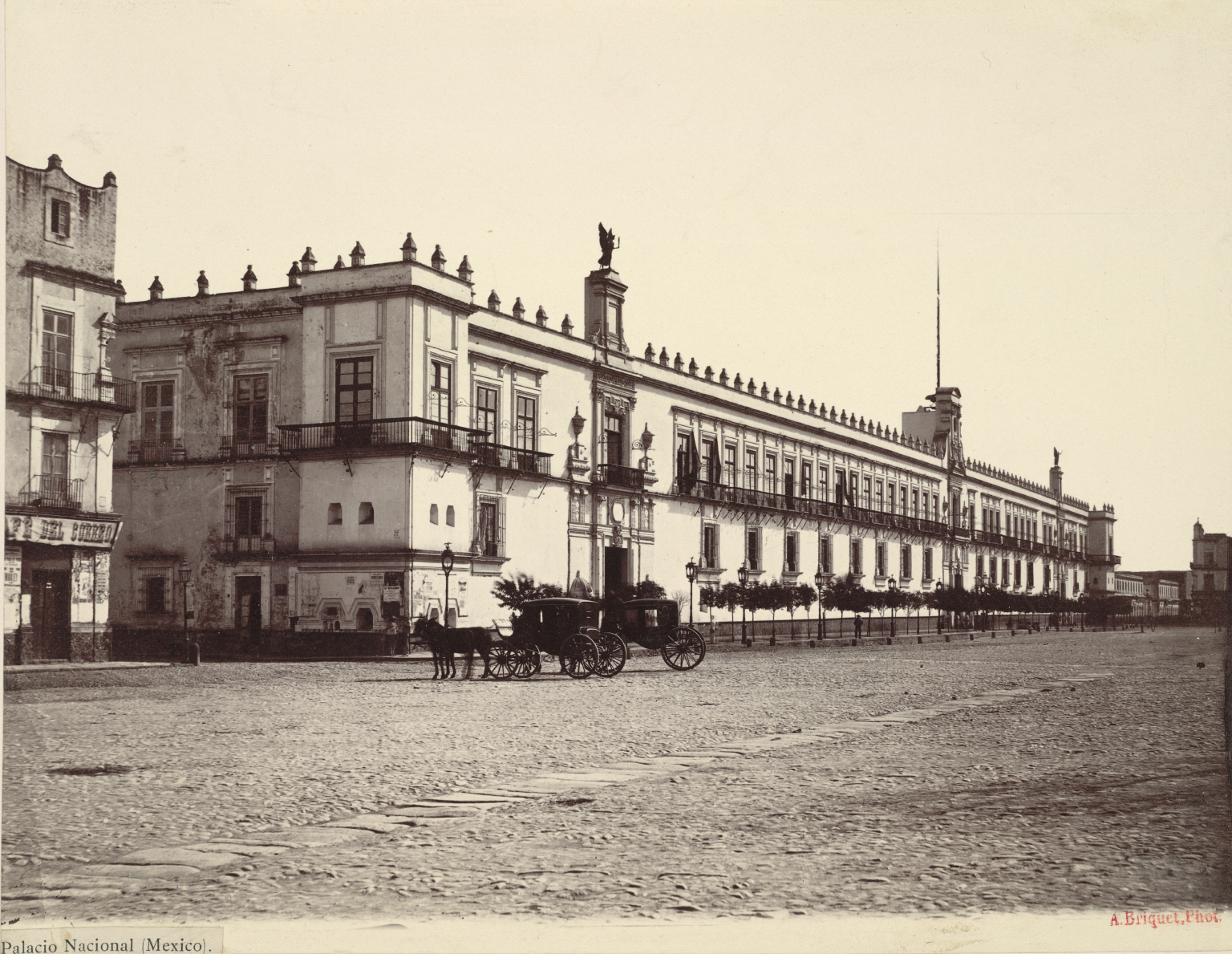
19th century photograph of the National Palace, showing its appearance prior to the addition of the third level

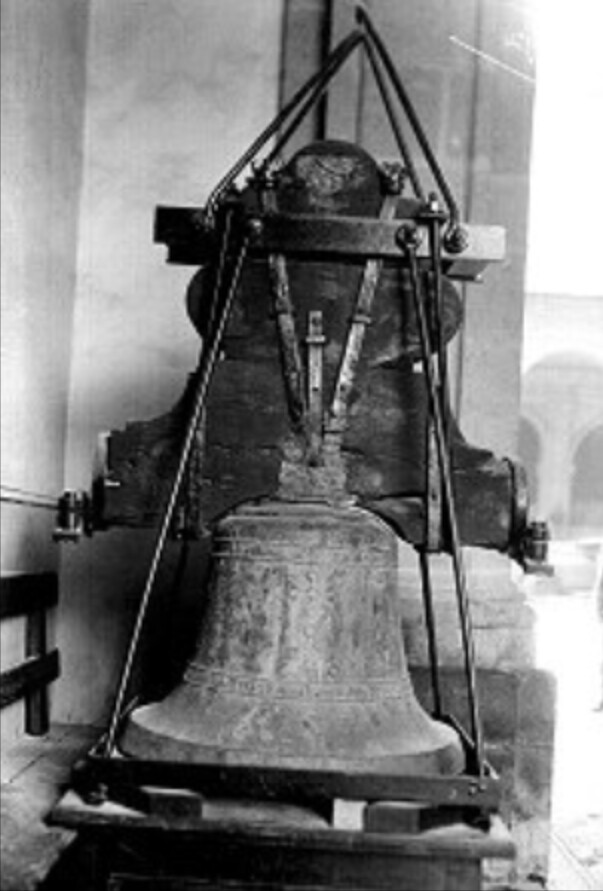
The Dolores Bell waiting for its placement in 1935

=== Incidents of damage ===
On November 8, 2014, alleged anarchists intentionally damaged the palace facade and windows with graffiti and by breaking windows, and burned down a section of the Mariana Door after a failed attempt at breaking it down. The National Institute of History and Anthropology (INAH) handled the restoration and presented charges for the damage. On March 6, 2024, protesters demonstrating in commemoration of the Iguala mass kidnapping in 2014 used a commandeered pickup truck to batter down the wooden doors of the palace before entering and getting expelled by security forces.

== Archaeological work ==
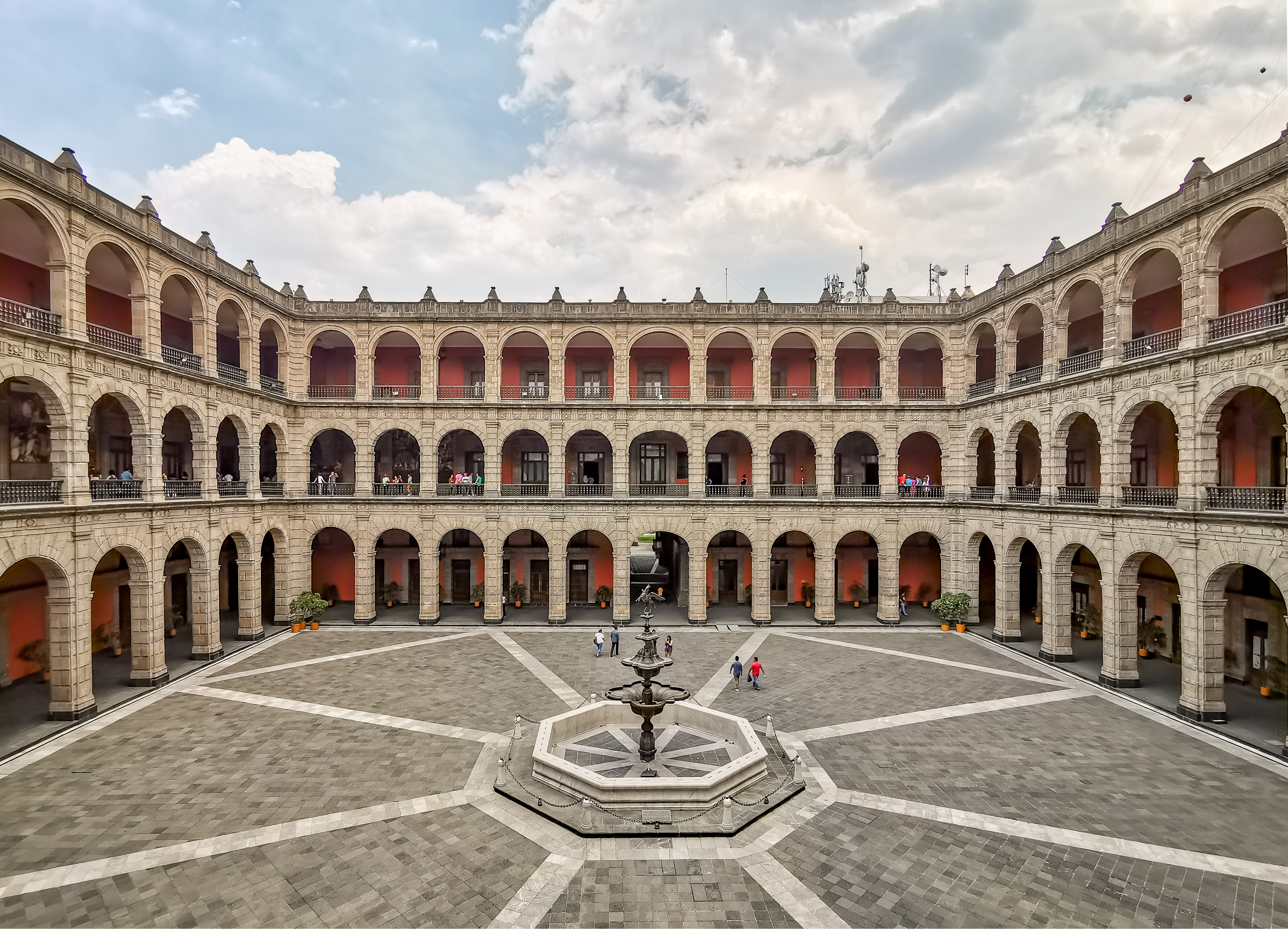
Central courtyard

Because of work related to the construction of Metro Line 2 and the acceleration of the sinking of many of the buildings in the historic center, the basic structure of the Palace suffered deterioration, requiring work to secure the building's foundation and supports, especially on the third floor, the central patio and the Patio of Honor. During this work, the old column bases of the Viceroy Palace were found, two of which were restored where they were found. They also found old cedar rafters with their brackets, which were used to form the foundation of the first floor.

Recently, excavations in and next to the National Palace have unearthed parts of Moctezuma's "New Houses", the name of the palaces that Hernán Cortés razed to build what has become the current edifice. Parts of a wall and a basalt floor were found during recent renovations on the building that now houses the Museum of Culture, which adjoins the Palace on its north side. The wall and floor are believed to be part of Casa Denegrida, or the Black House, which Spanish conquerors described as a windowless room painted in black. In here, Moctezuma would meditate on what he was told by professional seers and shamans. It was part of a construction which is thought to have consisted of five interconnected buildings containing the emperor's office, chambers for children and several wives and even a zoo. More excavations are planned.

== The building's significance ==
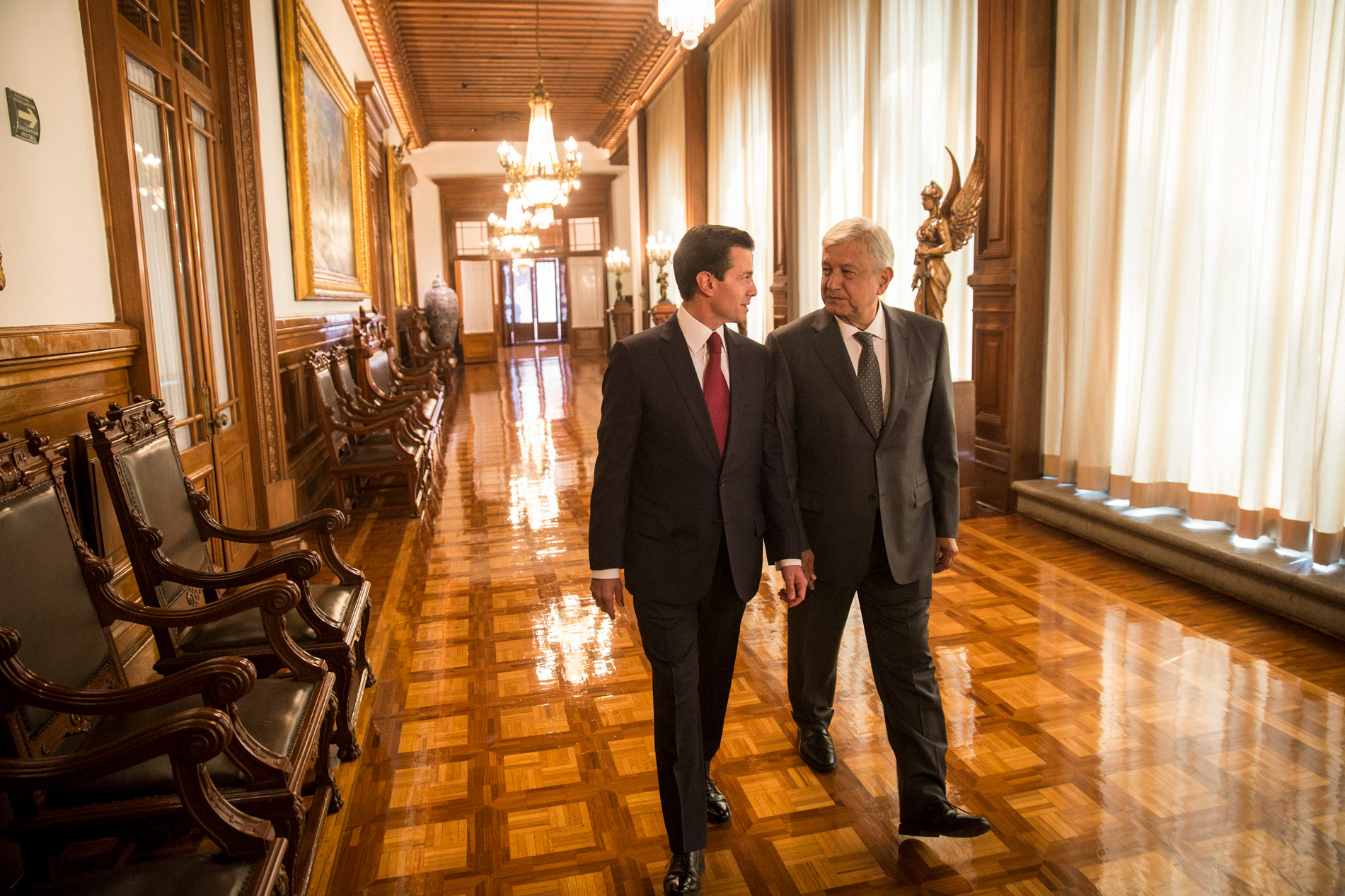
Meeting between Peña Nieto and López Obrador in the National Palace, July 3, 2018.

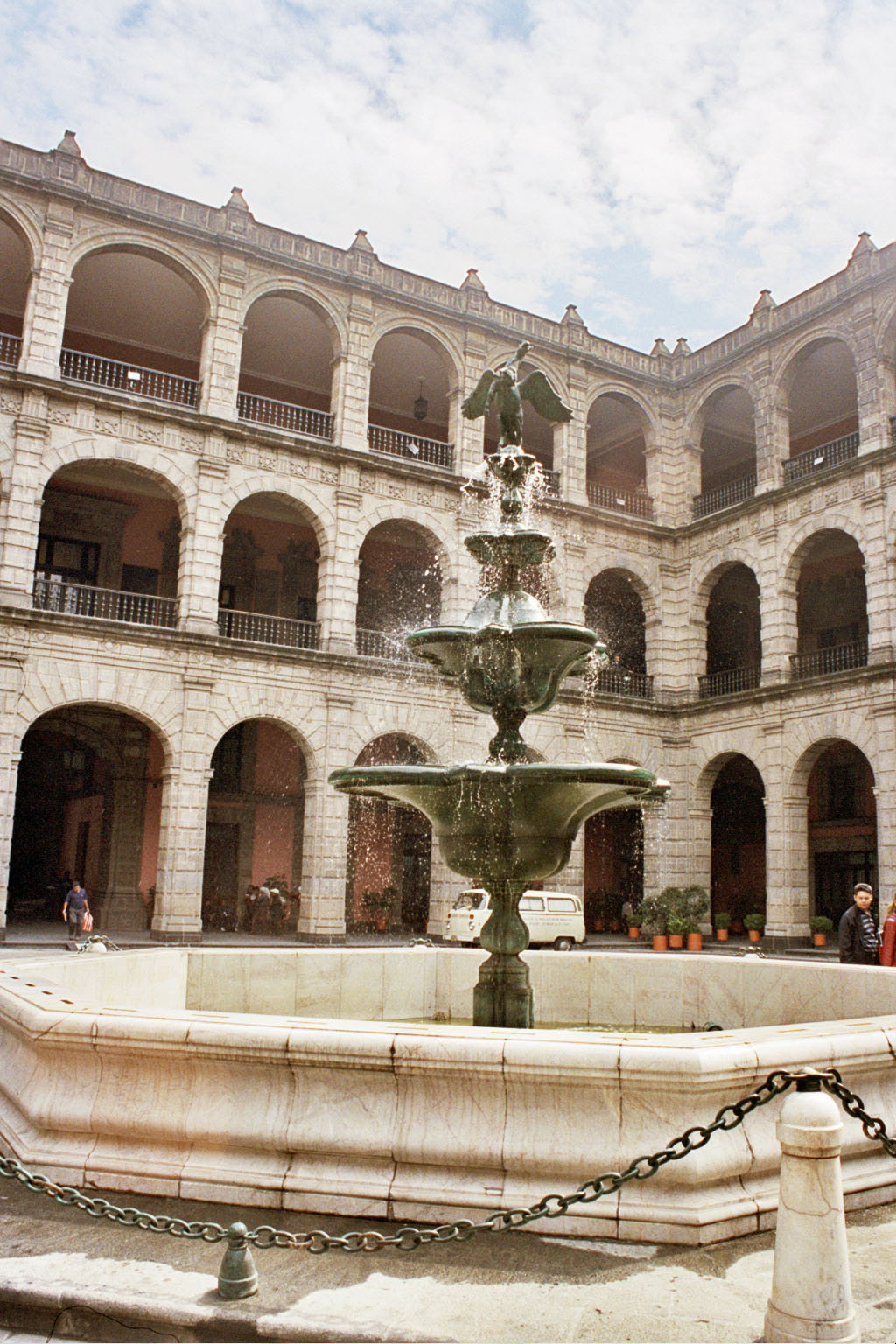
Fountain at the National Palace

On the webpage of past president Ernesto Zedillo, Carlos Fuentes calls the National Palace a "traveling and an immobile construction". Traveling is used in the sense that much of its architectural style is Spanish in origin and symbolized the transplanting of Spanish civilization to the New World. It is immobile in the sense that since Aztec times, this has been the seat of earthly political power, first as the palaces of the Aztec tlatoani, then of the Spanish viceroys, then of Mexican heads of state. Only until very recently, those who held power over Mexico lived here as well as asserted their authority.

The building itself represents the Mexican people as a blending of both Spanish and Aztec. The old palace was destroyed to make way for the new, but both were built of the very same stone. According to Zedillo, this represents something that is not quite Aztec, but not quite Spanish either, much like the country itself. These same stones were present during all of Mexico's major historical events and had seen foreign flags fly above them.

On the eve of Mexican Independence Day, the National Palace is the star of the show. The original bell Father Hidalgo rang is here and the President himself gives the Grito de Dolores from its main balcony. He also notes one such Independence Eve, in 1964, when General Charles de Gaulle, then-President of France, spoke to the crowd in Spanish from the Palace. He notes this to assert that the Palace is not only a place but also a destination where friends of the country can be welcomed.

== Cats ==
Feral cats have been recorded to have been inhabiting the palace gardens since the 1970s, with 19 cats in residence as of 2024. In April that same year, President Andres Manuel López Obrador declared the cats to be "living fixed assets," the first time animals in Mexico have been awarded the title. The measure, which is normally granted to tangible objects, requires the Secretariat of Finance and Public Credit to provide permanent food and care for them in their lifetimes. One cat, Zeus, became famous for appearing on-camera during a press conference by López Obrador in 2023.

== Gallery ==
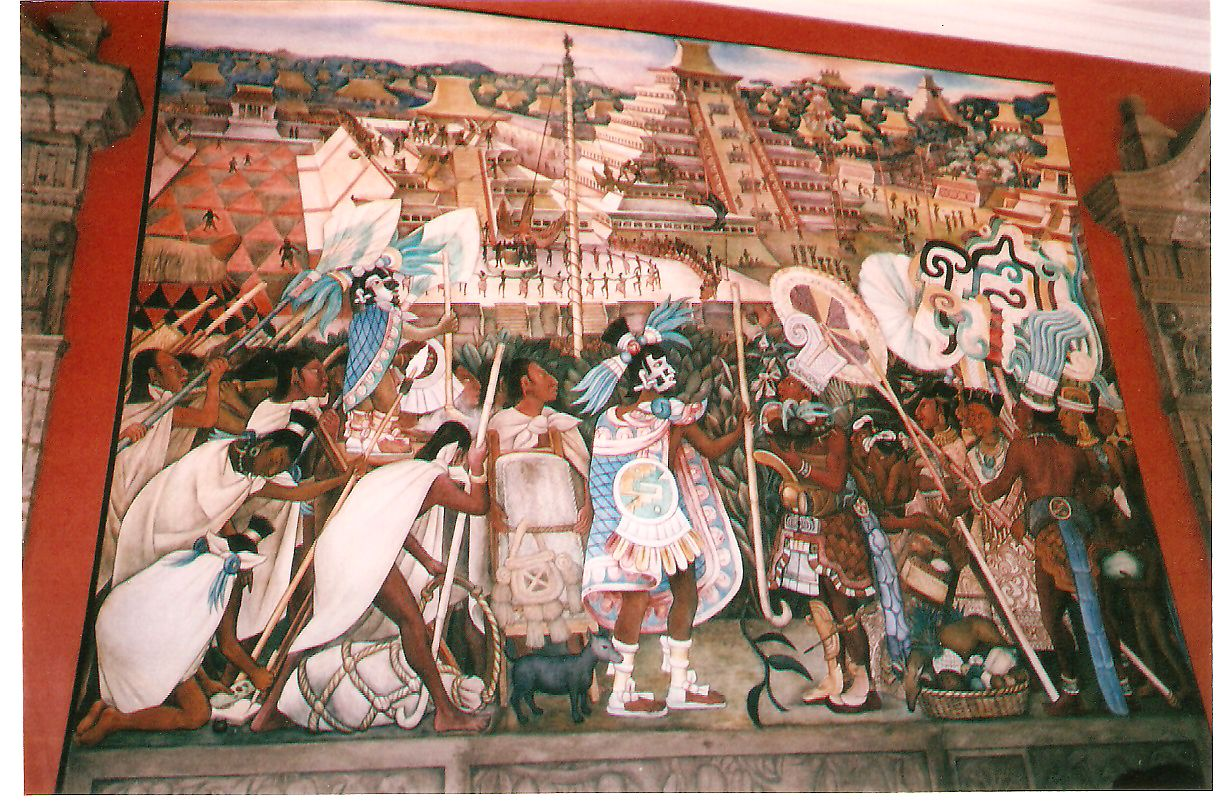
Mural by Diego Rivera

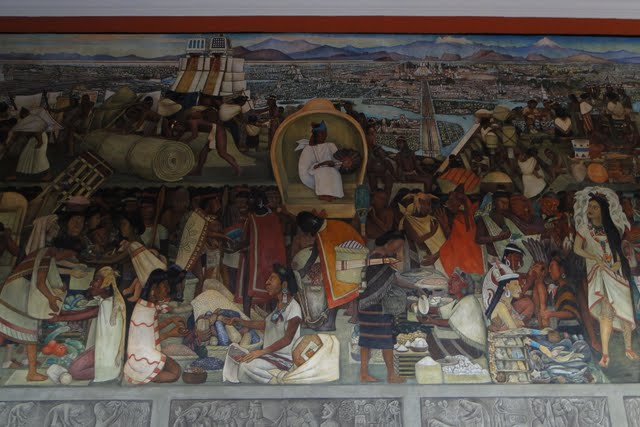
Mural by Diego Rivera in National Palace

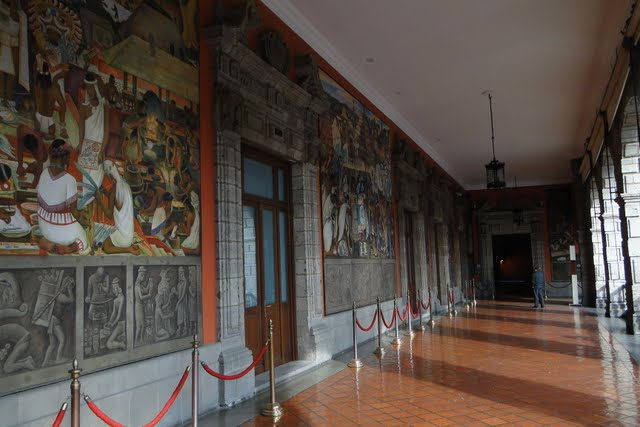
Mural by Diego Rivera in National Palace

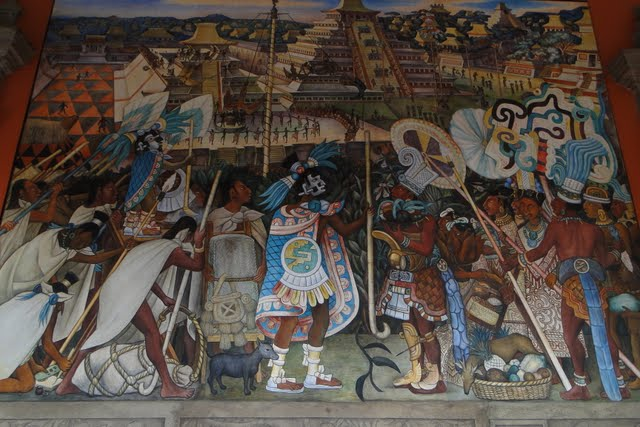
Mural by Diego Rivera in National Palace

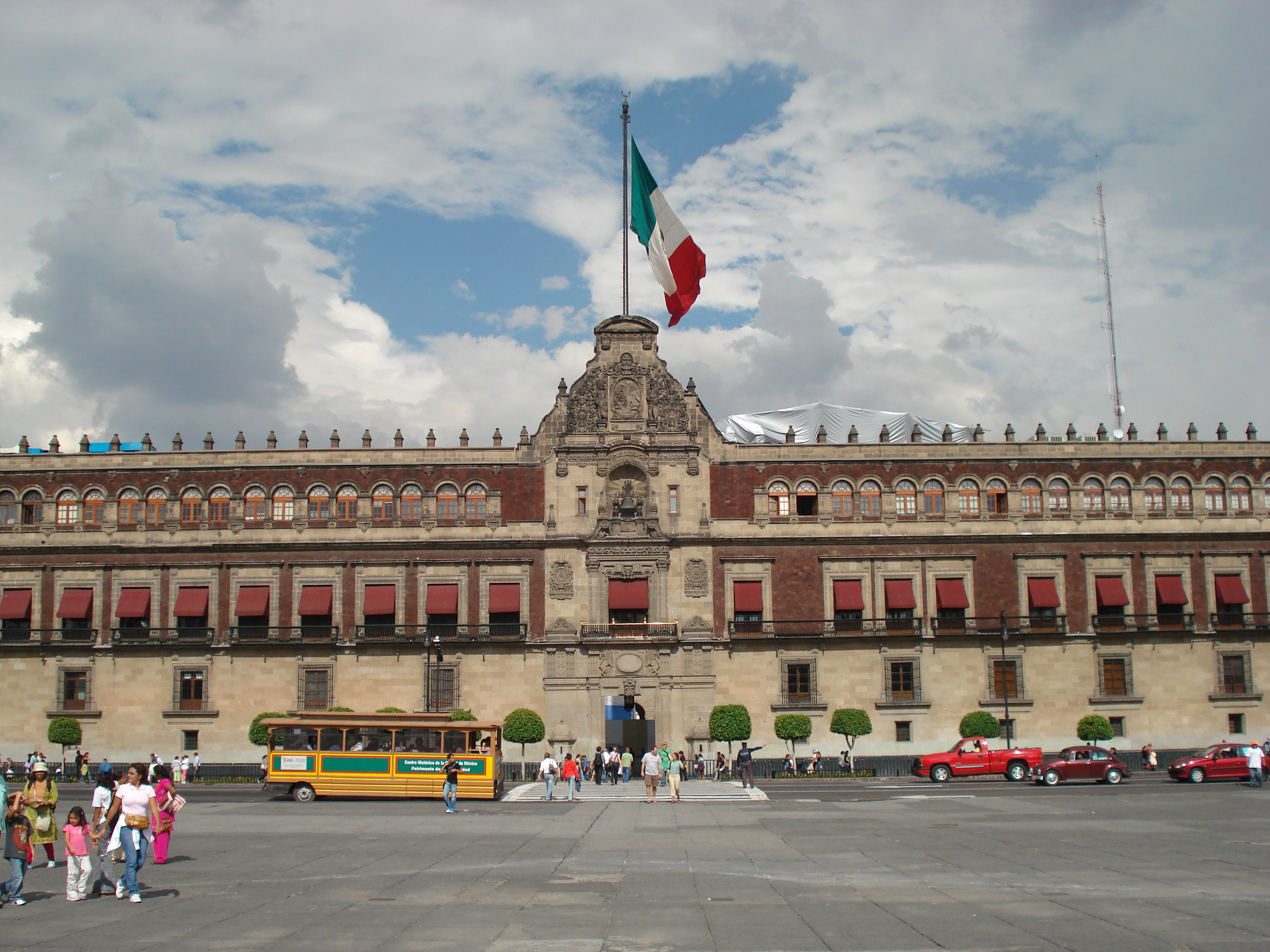
Front of the National Palace

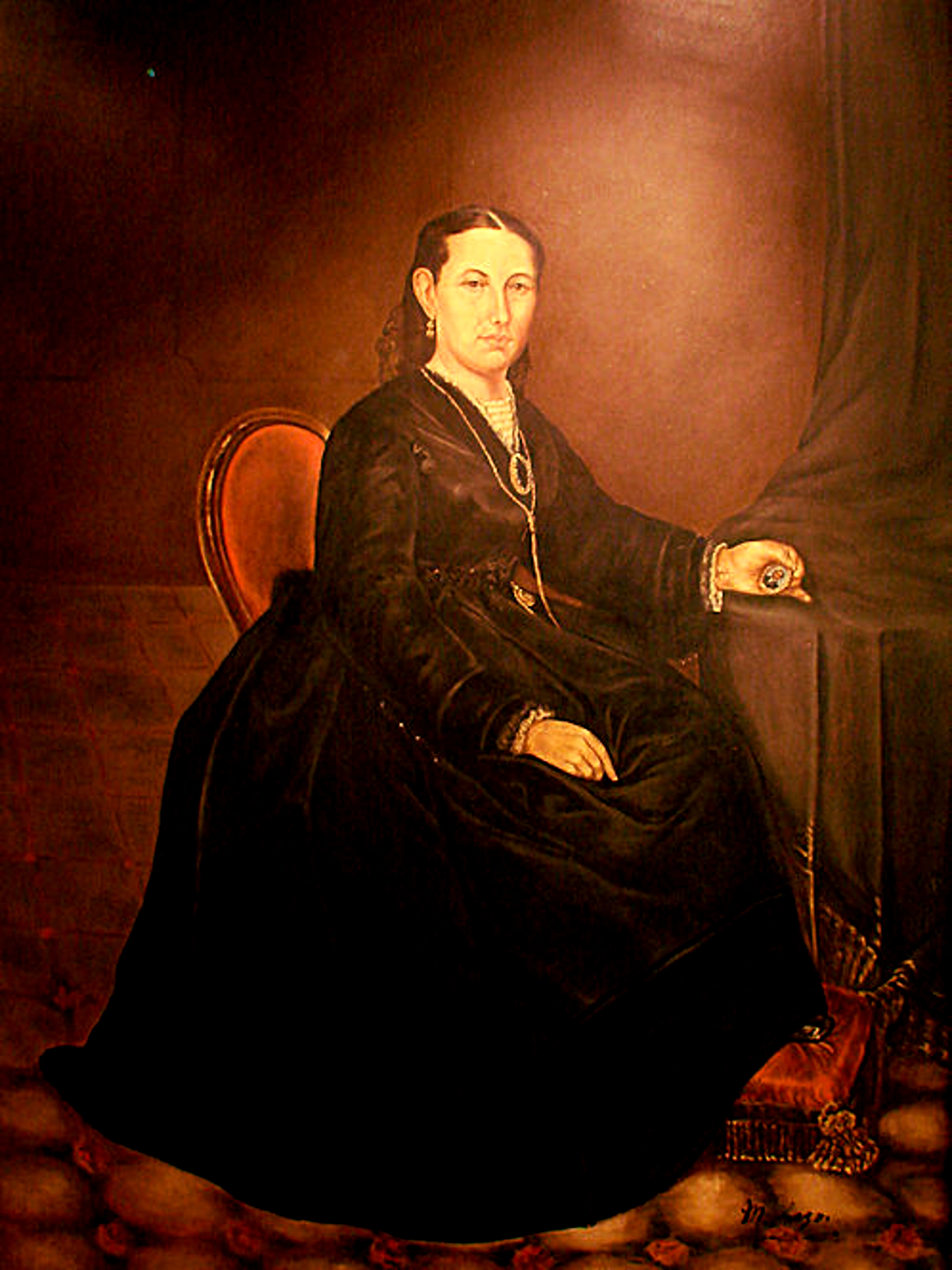
Portrait of Margarita Maza de Juárez in Juárez Museum

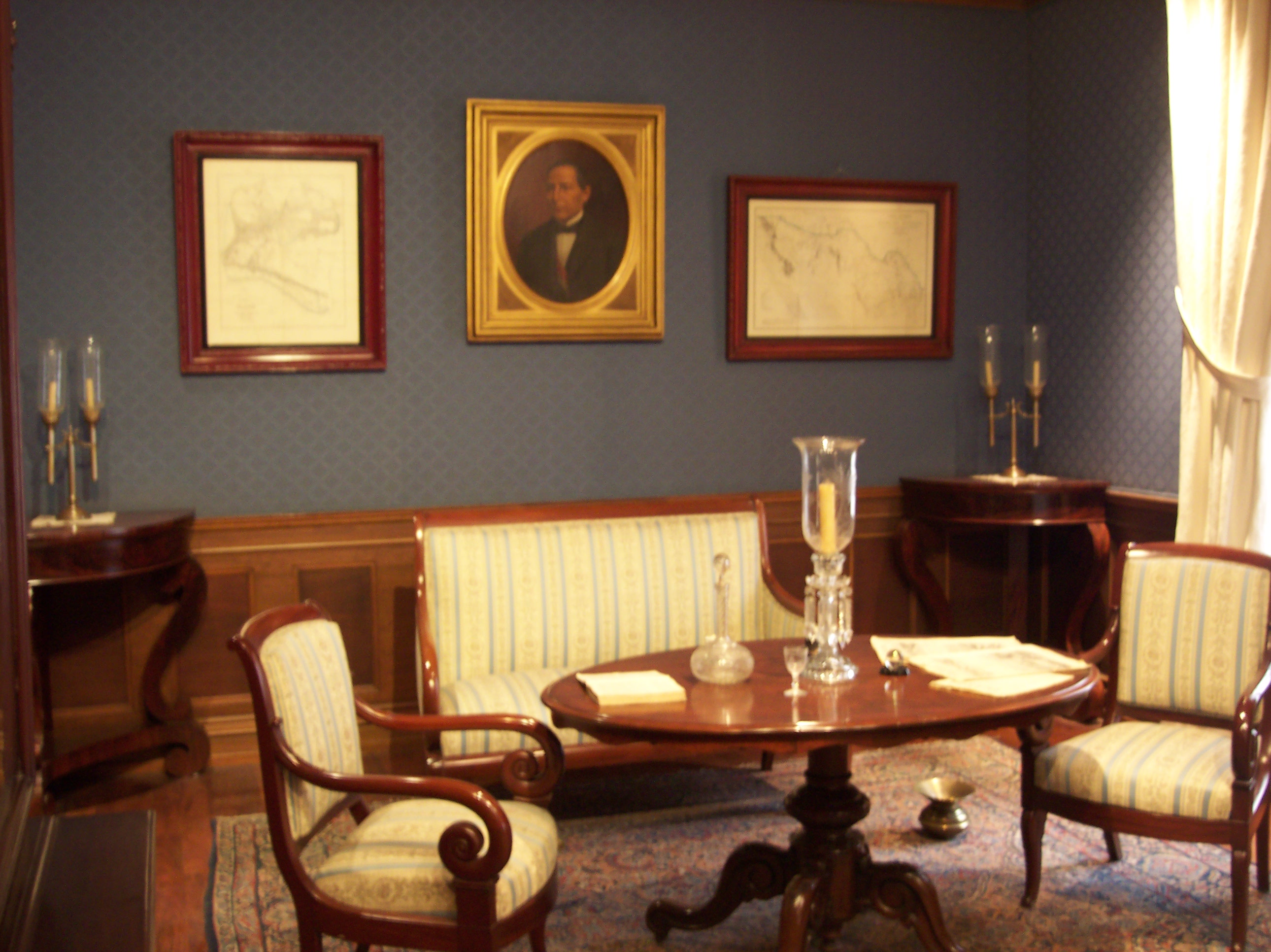
Juárez's study in the Juárez Museum

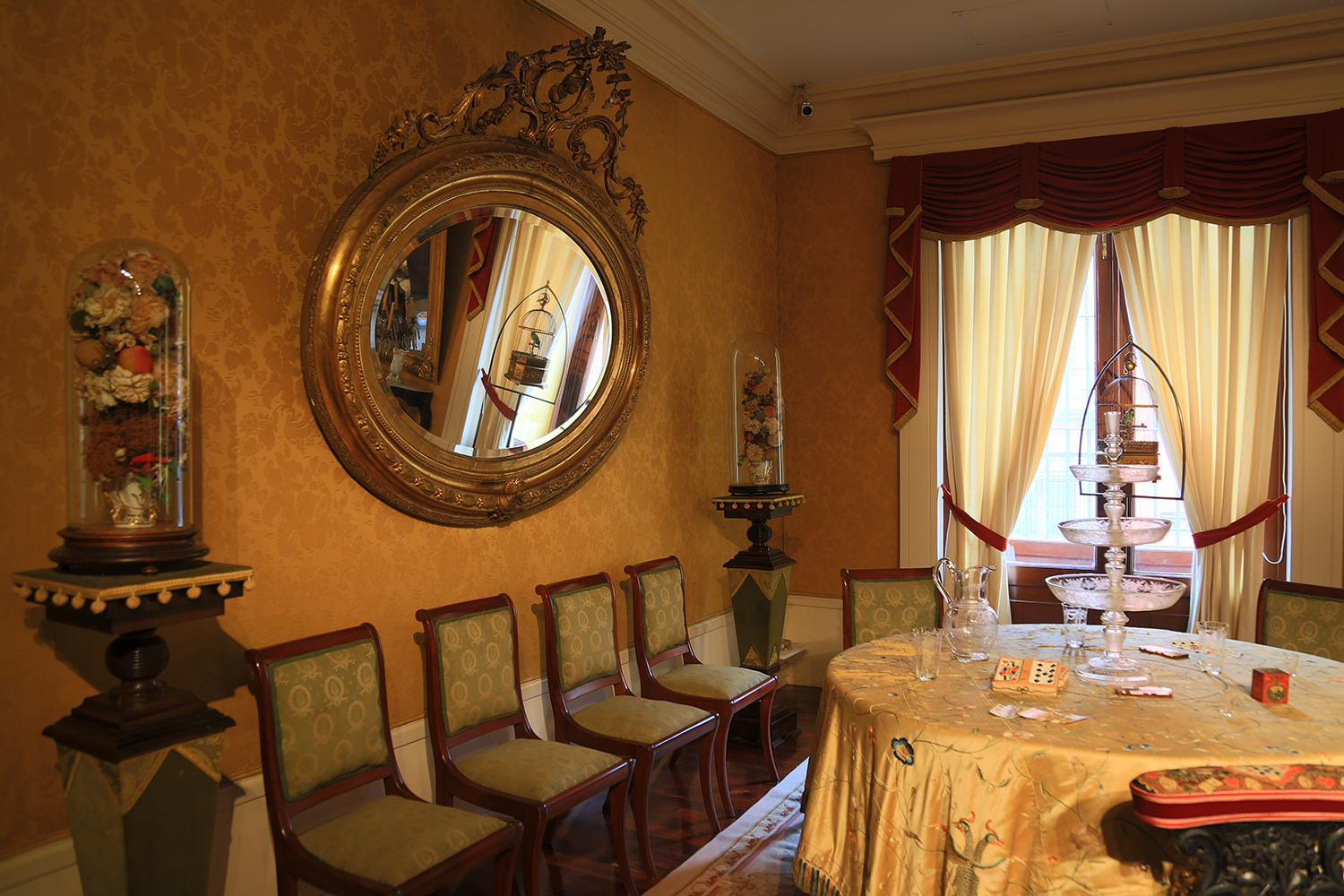
Juárez's dining room in Juárez Museum

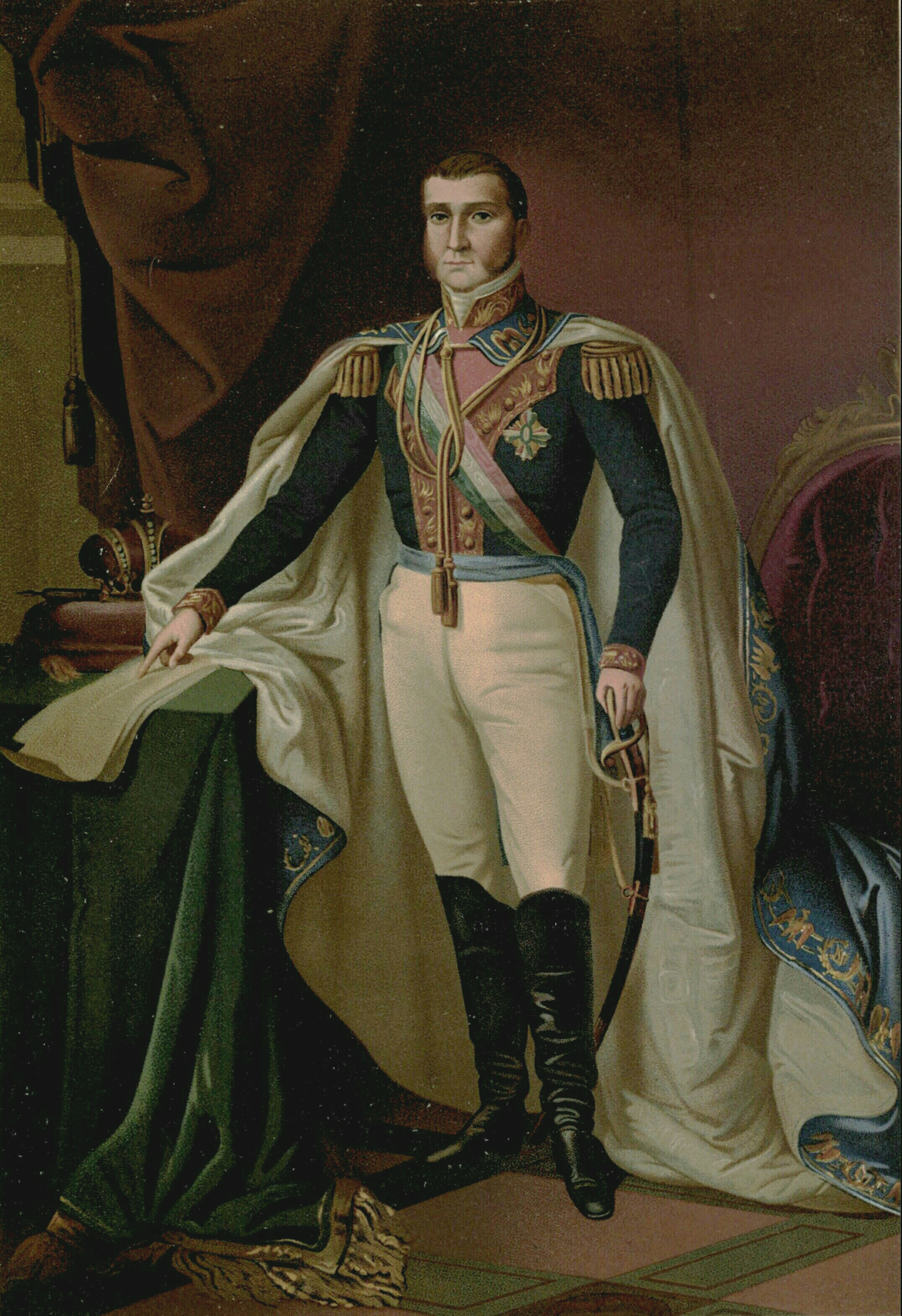
Portrait of Agustín de Iturbide

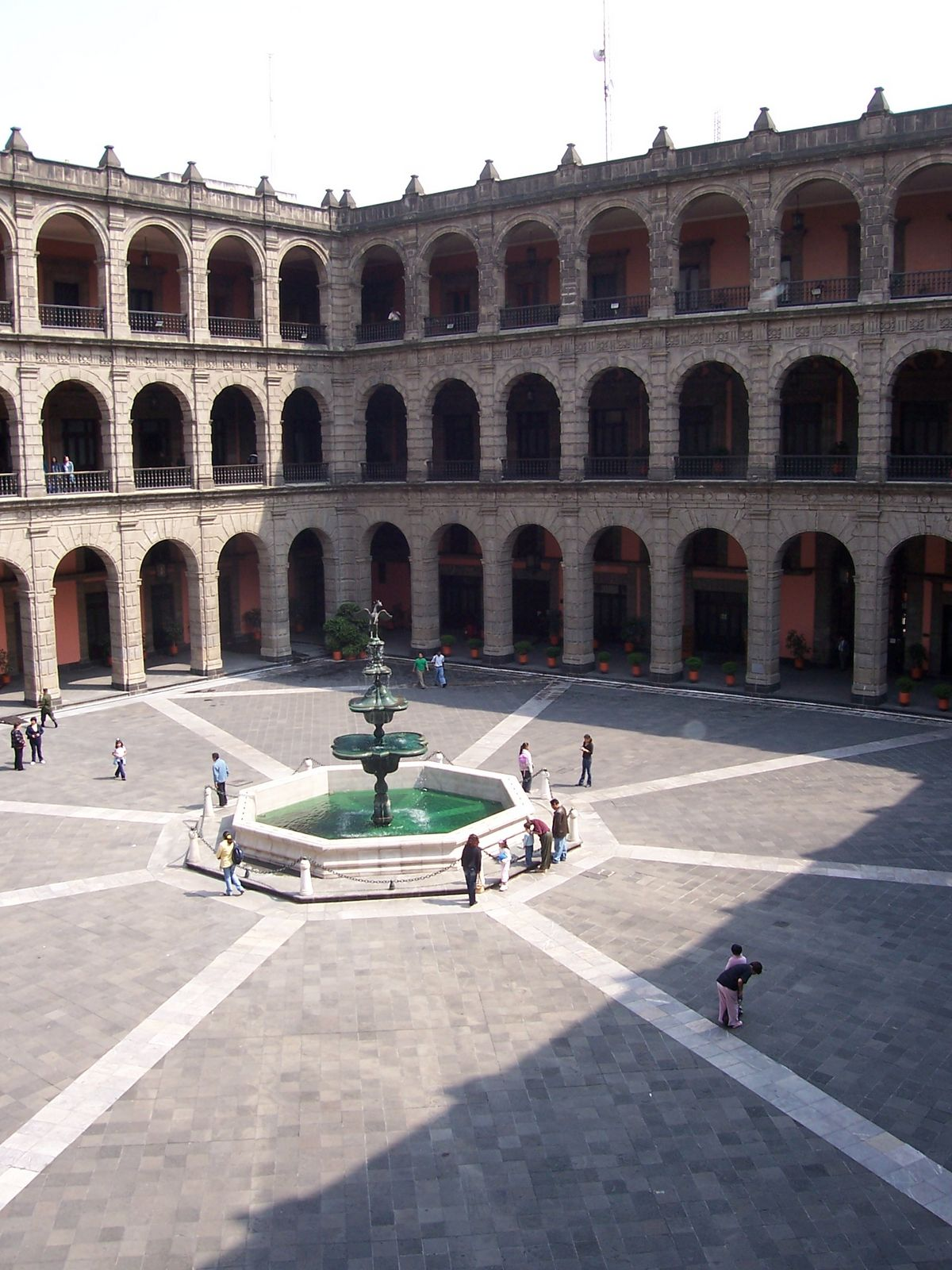
Interior of the Nacional Palace

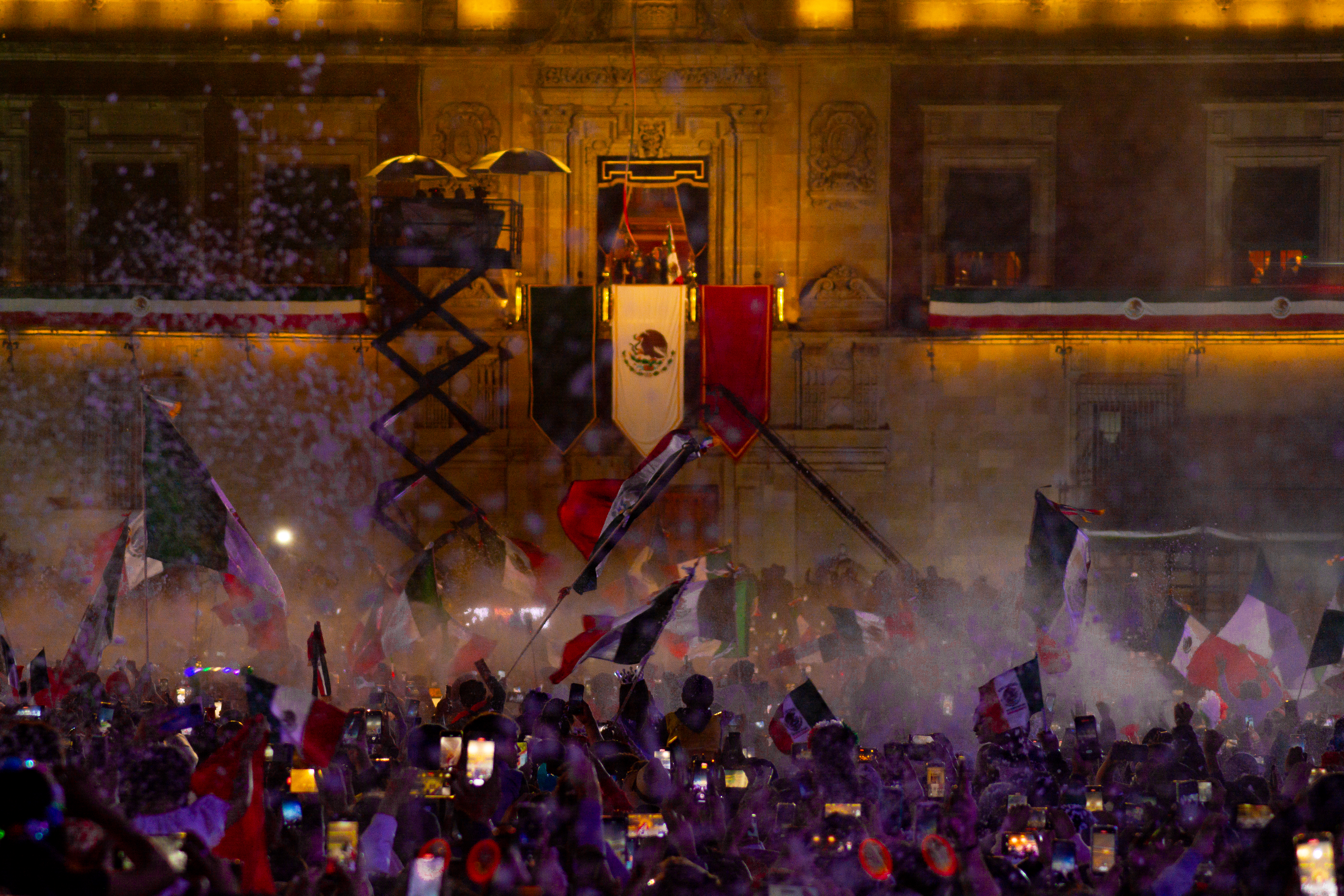
El Grito in 2023

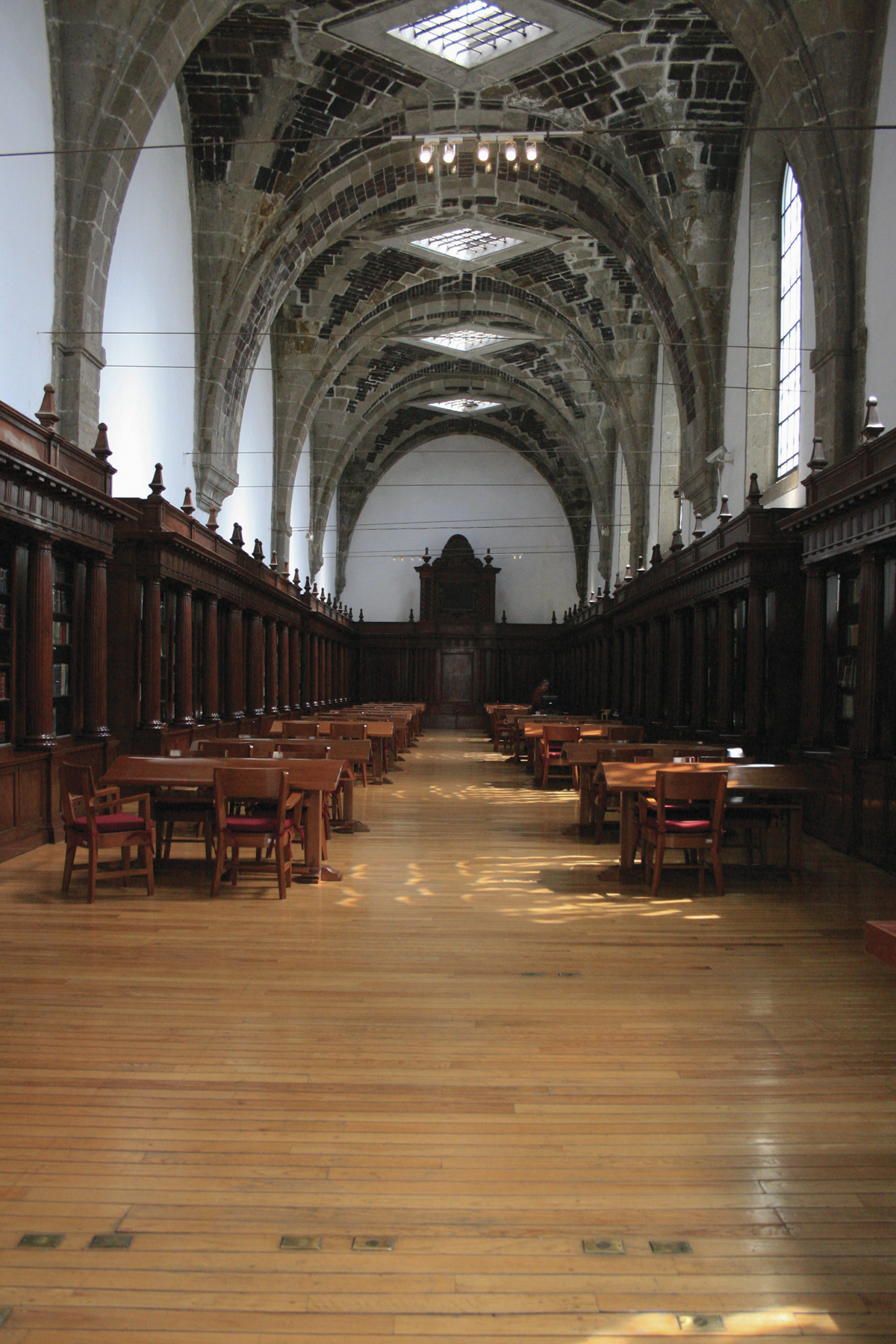
Complex's library

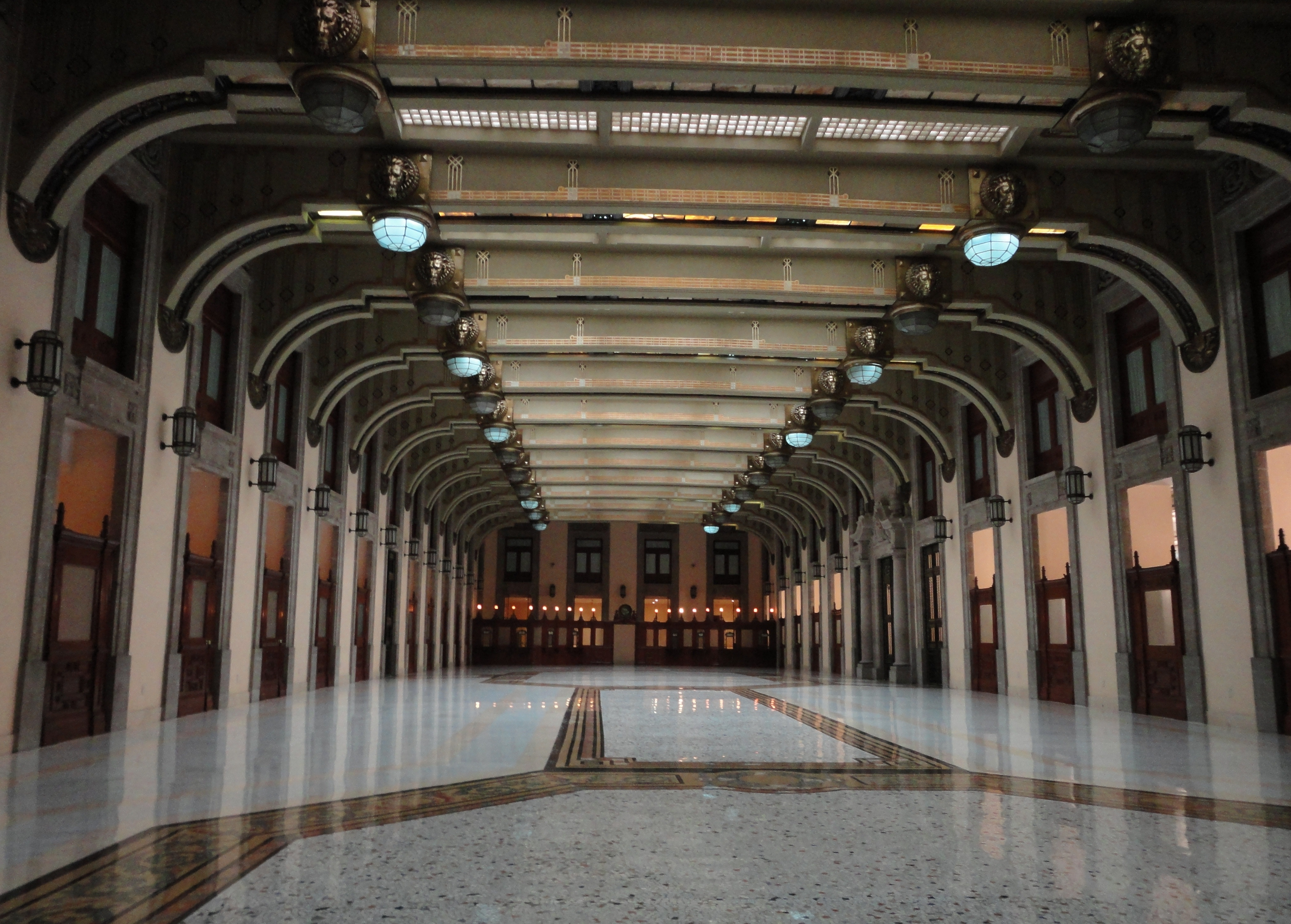
Old hall of the Treasury at the National Palace

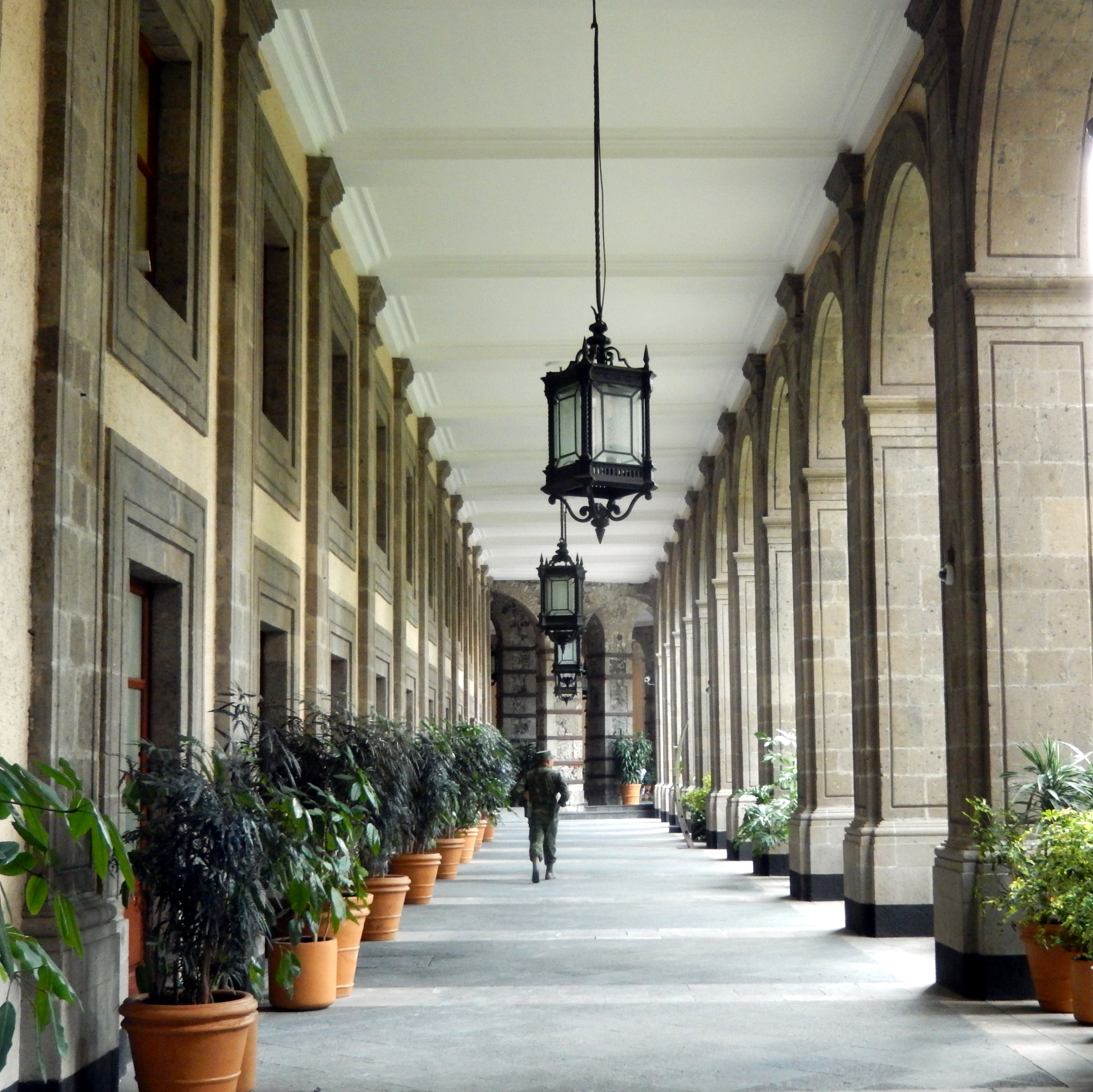
National Palace internal corredor

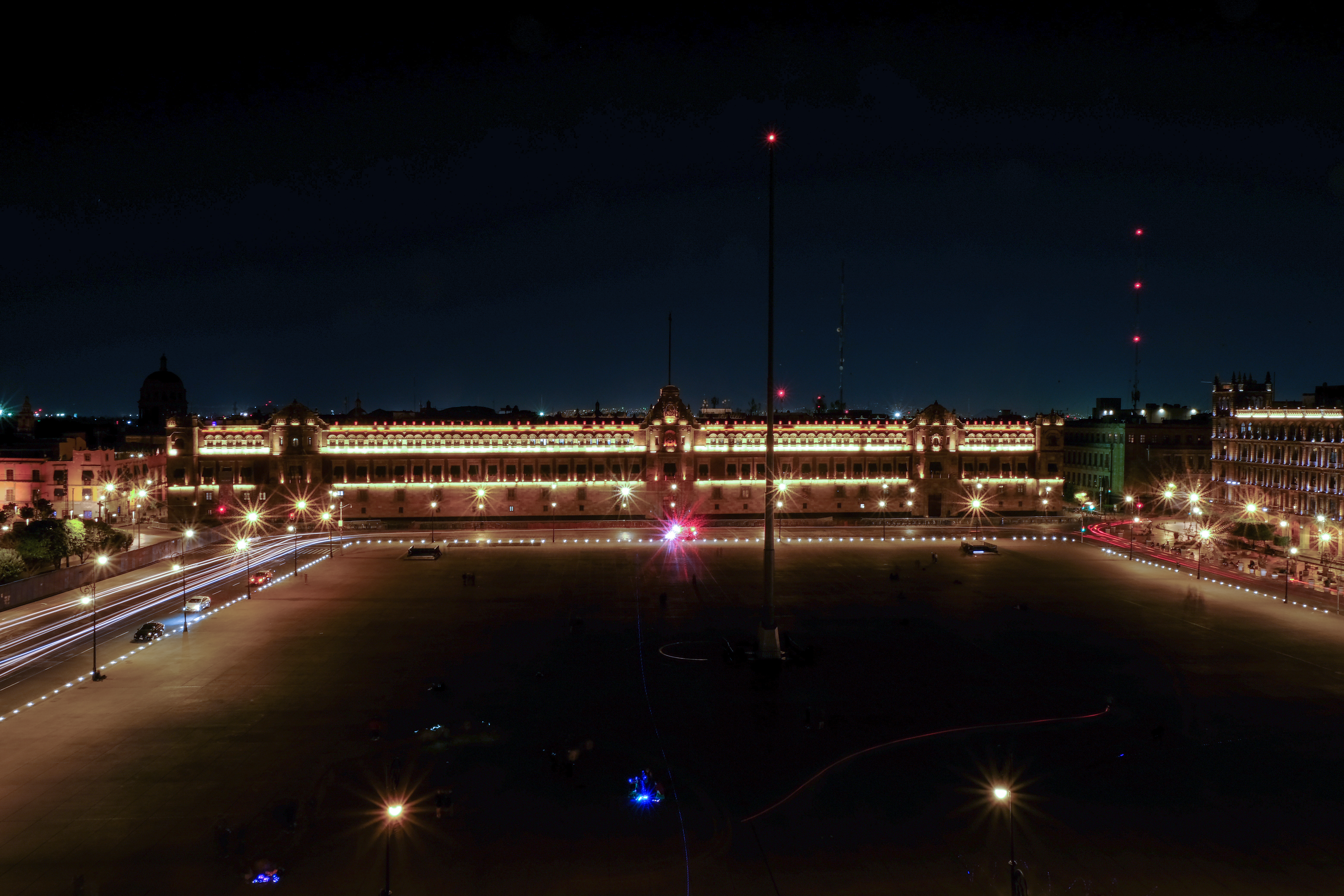
Palacio Nacional at night
