= The History of Mexico (mural) =

Mural by Diego Rivera in Mexico City, Mexico

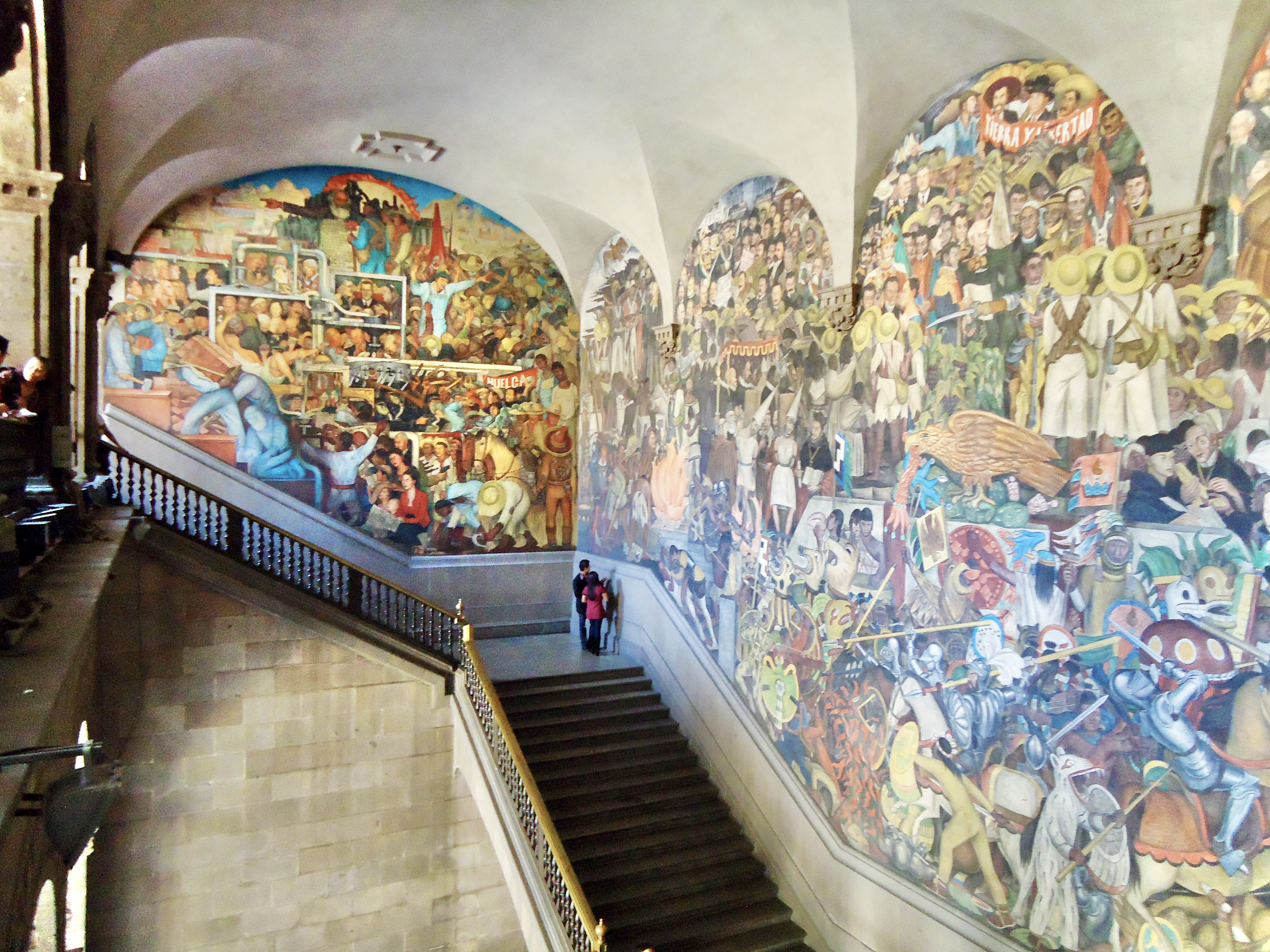
The History of Mexico – mural in the National Palace in Mexico City

The History of Mexico is a mural in the stairwell of the National Palace in Mexico City by Diego Rivera. Produced between 1929 and 1935, the mural depicts Mexico's history from ancient times to the present, with particular emphasis on the struggles of the common Mexican people fighting against the Spanish, the French, and the dictators that controlled the country at different points in its history.

== History ==
Government-sponsored murals were commissioned after the end of the Mexican Revolution, mainly in Mexico City and surrounding areas between 1923 and 1939 to celebrate the overthrow of the Porfirio Diaz dictatorship. The government commissioned various artists, most famously José Clemente Orozco, David Alfaro Siqueiros, and Rivera himself to paint scenes about Mexican history. Rivera began painting The History of Mexico in August 1929 in the stairwells of the National Palace. It took six years to complete.

== Description ==
The mural consists of three distinct sections across three walls, thematically divided in chronological order: ancient Mexico, the colonial past to the present, and the future. The murals are huge, some as large as 70 meters by 9 meters.

=== North wall ===
This section of the mural depicts ancient Aztec culture. An image of the sun, which was the center of the world in the Aztec religion is shown. Below the sun are a pyramid and an Aztec leader. The everyday lives of the Aztecs are also shown in detail: artisans weaving and making pottery, mothers carrying babies, painting on scrolls, and calligraphy. Religious practices such as dances to the Sun God and the worship of snakes and jaguars are also shown. Rivera also included geographical features such as the volcanoes around the Valley of Mexico, as well corn and other crops.

=== West wall ===
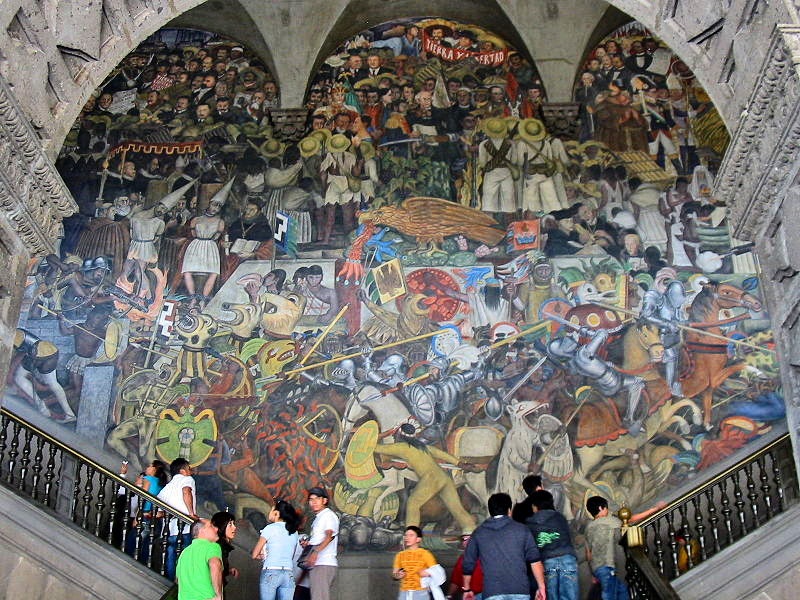
The History of Mexico

The west wall forms the central part of the mural and summarizes the history of Mexico as a series of conflicts, rebellions, and revolution against oppression. Common Mexicans and Indians revolt against the Spanish, French, and various dictators, especially Porfirio Diaz.

The bottom of the wall shows Aztecs and other Indians fighting valiantly against conquistador Hernán Cortés and his army. In the middle, the Spaniards attempt to destroy the Aztec religion by obliterating sacred books and religious images during the Inquisition. The left and right sides of the wall depict the colonial period, including the rape of a Native American woman by a Spaniard conquistador. This section also illustrates the Natives that supported the Spanish in their conquest. Adjacent are scenes of Natives working as slaves for the Spaniards, making weapons, constructing walls and buildings (including the National Palace itself), and providing food. This part also portrays the destruction and attempted assimilation of Native American culture by the Spaniards, including a depiction of Catholic conversion.

The center of the wall is a large eagle with a serpent in its mouth, a symbol of both Aztec culture and modern Mexico.

The upper corners of the wall depict the Second French intervention in Mexico and the triumph of president Benito Juarez over emperor Maximilian, whose execution is shown. The upper center shows images of the Mexican Revolution itself and the victorious peasant armies of revolution leaders Emiliano Zapata and Pancho Villa, adorned with a red banner displaying the anarchist slogan "Tierra y Libertad" ("Land and Liberty").

=== South wall ===
This part of the mural depicts an imaginary future of Mexico. It shows factories, the Soviet flag (Rivera and the government at the time were socialists), workers, Karl Marx the Communist Manifesto, and an image of Rivera's wife Frida Kahlo. Kahlo and her sister Cristina are shown as socialist teachers bringing a glorious future to school children.

== Interpretation ==
Art historian Leonard Folgarait notes that Rivera depicts the rich and foreigners who took over Mexico as evil, while the poor, peasants, Native American, farmers and workers are on the side of good and freedom. Given the context of post-Revolutionary Mexico, the mural could thus be seen as a declaration that the revolution had finally brought justice to the Mexican people who had long been oppressed by foreign powers and national dictators, while simultaneously emphasizing his vision of the culture of Mexico – bright colors, rich traditions, and old customs.

== See also ==
- List of works by Diego Rivera
