= Skull Mexican make-up =

Face makeup style

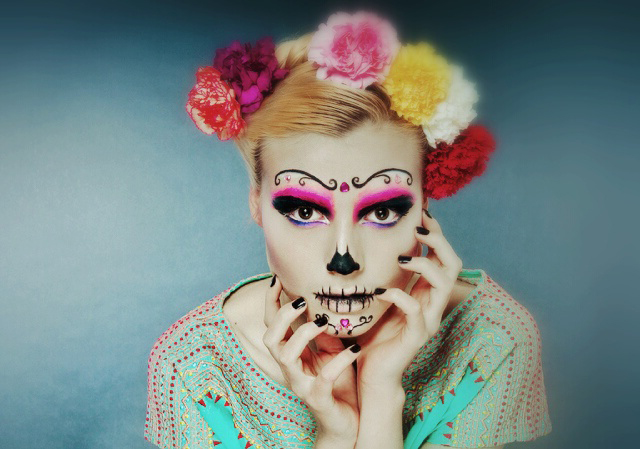
Skull makeup

Skull Mexican makeup, sugar skull makeup or calavera makeup, is a makeup style that is used to create the appearance of the character La Calavera Catrina that people use during Day of the Dead (Mexican Día de Muertos) festivities.
