= La Calavera Catrina =

1910–1913 etching by Mexican cartoon illustrator Posada

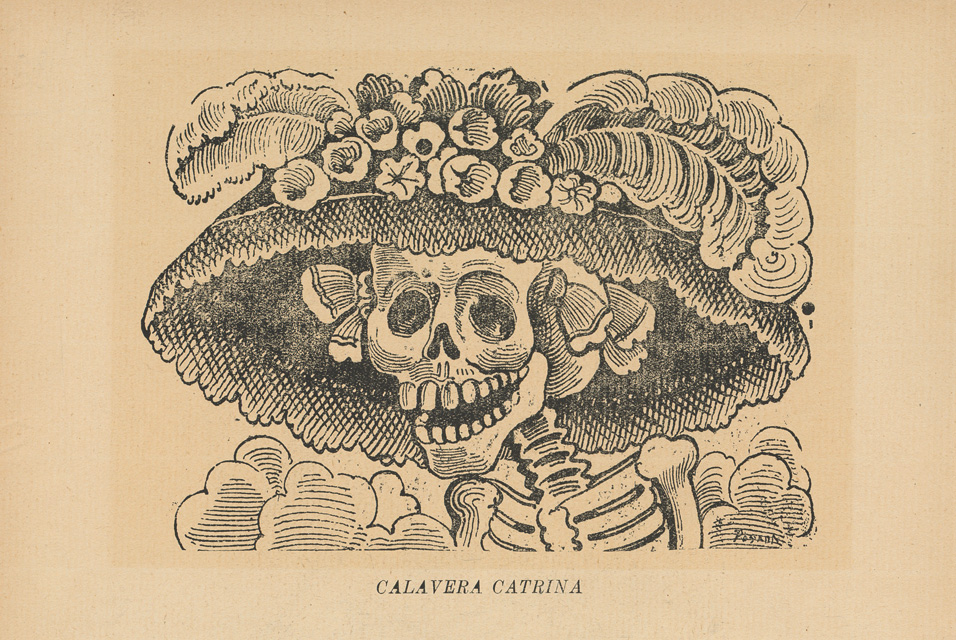
La Calavera Catrina

La Calavera Catrina ("The Dapper Skull") is an image and associated character originating as a zinc etching created by the Mexican printmaker and lithographer José Guadalupe Posada (1852–1913). The image is usually dated c. 1910–1913 Its first certain publication date is 1913, when it appeared in a satiric broadside (a newspaper-sized sheet of paper) as a photo-relief etching.

In 1947, the Mexican muralist Diego Rivera (1886–1957) elaborated Posada's creation into a full-scale figure that he placed in his fresco "A Dream of a Sunday Afternoon in the Alameda Park" (now in the Museo Mural Diego Rivera). Whereas Posada's print intended to satirize upper class women of the Porfiriato, Rivera, through various iconographic attributes that referenced indigenous cultures, rehabilitated her into a Mexican national symbol.

La Catrina is a ubiquitous character associated with Day of the Dead (Spanish: Día de Muertos), both in Mexico and around the world. Additionally, it has become an icon of Mexican identity, sometimes used in opposition to the Halloween Jack-o'-lantern.

== First appearances ==
=== Vanegas Arroyo Broadsides ===
The Antonio Vanegas Arroyo and his family published many of Posada's most important works. Curator Ruben C. Cordova has identified four broadsides published by the Vanegas Arroyo family that feature Posada's Catrina image. All of these broadsides have different texts (none of them written by Posada) and different subsidiary images and graphic devices. The first of these broadsides, was published for Day of the Dead in 1913 (it bears a date), and is titled "Remate de Calaveras Alegres y Sandungueras, Las que hoy son empolvadas Garbanceras pararán en deformes calaveras" ("The Ending of the Cheerful and Sandunga-dancing skulls", "those that today are powdered ordinary and vulgar will end as deformed skulls"). Though Posada had made his print as a criticism of the wealthy elite, the text of the 1913 broadside was a vicious attack on working class women who sold garbanzo beans (instead of foods native to Mexico).

The second publication of Posada's image was in a broadside titled "Han Salido por Fin, Las Calaveras" ("They have finally left"), issued sometime after Antonio Vanegas Arroyo's death in 1917. The third broadside with the Catrina image was called "Calaveras de la Cucaracha, Una Fiesta en Ultratumba" ("Calaveras of the cockroach, a fiesta from beyond the grave"). The text includes the word "catrines" (male dandies, plural). Cordova thinks the impression of this broadside that he illustrated was printed in the 1920s (it bears two prices, five cents and ten cents, and therefore was likely republished). "El Panteon de las Pelonas" ("Graveyard of bald/dead women"), the fourth Catrina broadside, bears the date 1924.

=== Posada's Rediscovery and the Emergence of Catrina ===
The French-born Mexican artist Jean Charlot played a key role in the rediscovery of Posada, who was little known after his death. The image we know as Catrina appeared in a book for the first time 1930, at which time the title Calavera Catrina was attached to it. In 1944, the Catrina image appeared on the cover of an exhibition catalogue for the Art Institute of Chicago. At this time, Art Institute catalogues (with Catrina on the cover) and individual prints of Catrina were widely distributed in Mexico and the U.S., providing Catrina with high visibility.

=== Diego Rivera's Dream of a Sunday Afternoon: Catrina Transformed ===
Diego Rivera's mural Sueño de una Tarde Dominical en la Alameda Central ("Dream of a Sunday afternoon in the Central Alameda"), which stretches 15.6 metres (51 ft) and depicts 400 years of Mexican history from the Spanish Conquest to the Revolution. Rivera included many historical figures in the fresco, which was originally painted for the Hotel del Prado in the historic center of Mexico City. When the 1985 earthquake required the demolition of the hotel, the fresco was moved to the Museo Mural Diego Rivera, which is adjacent to the Alameda Park. The museum was built specifically to house and display Rivera's restored mural.

Rivera placed Posada (dressed in a black suit) and Catrina in the center of his fresco. Rivera depicted himself as a boy who holds Catrina's hand. Frida Kahlo stands behind and between them. Rivera keeps the big bourgeois hat that Posada gave to Catrina. But instead of outfitting her with a matching bourgeois gown, he puts her in a simple Tehuana skirt, similar to those Kahlo wore, which were associated with indigenous women from Tehuantepec. The feather rattlesnake boa that Catrina wears links her to the Mesoamerican god Quetzalcoatl (the feathered serpent), and its stone rattle connects it to the Aztec goddess Coatlicue ("She of the Serpent Skirt"). Like snakes and Coatlicue, Rivera's Catrina has fangs and a bloody mouth. The gold belt buckle has an ollin glyph, which symbolizes movement (and the earthquakes the Aztecs thought would end their era). Eyes are visible behind the skull mask, which arguably makes Rivera's Catrina a life and death figure. Cordova argues that Rivera made Catrina into a nationalist emblem that referenced indigenous cultures and the philosophy of dualism.

== Cultural importance ==
Catrina became central to Mexican identity in part because Posada was made into the "primary artistic ancestor figure" for the generation of the Mexican Muralists. Additionally, for many years, influential Day of the Dead festivities in Mexico City were held at museums that centered on Rivera and Kahlo, where the Linares family made three-dimensional versions of Posada's prints out of papier mâché. Consequently, Posada, Rivera, and Kahlo were woven into foundational urban commemorations in Mexico City. Even without the Mesoamerican attributes Rivera provided to Catrina, she still functions as a national emblem associated specifically with Mexico.

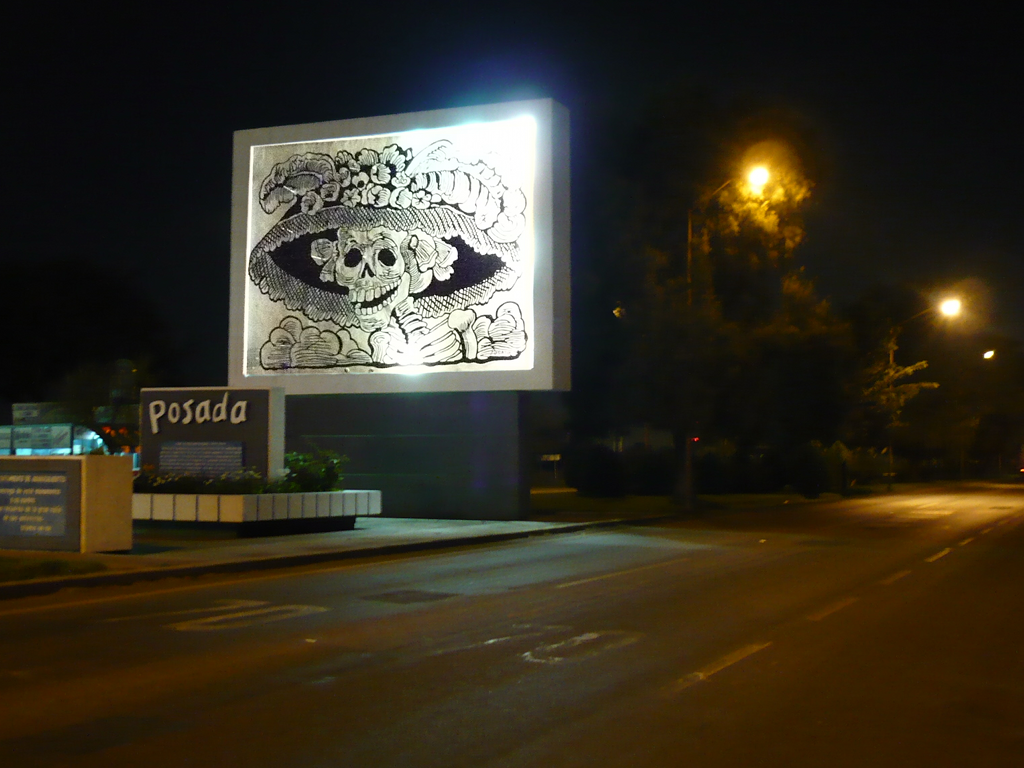
Large image of Catrina on the road from the airport to Aguascalientes, Posada's home town.

== Artistic subtext ==
=== Culture ===
The Calavera is a well-established tradition in Mexico. Satiric works such as Posada's Catrina were created during (or in the immediate aftermath of) the polarizing reign of dictator Porfirio Díaz. Díaz is lauded for modernizing and bringing financial stability to Mexico, but he also led his government in repression, corruption, and excess, and had an obsession with European materialism and culture. Christine Delsol writes: "Concentration of fantastic wealth in the hands of the privileged few brewed discontent in the hearts of the suffering many, leading to the 1910 rebellion that toppled Diaz in 1911 and became the Mexican Revolution."

Catrina appears on all manner of commercial and festive products relating to Day of the Dead. Her image inspires numerous artists to recreate her every year, out of nearly every imaginable material. Additionally, her image is often assembled out of diverse materials (even people), as a collage or assemblage. In recent years, highly publicized contests have taken place for the biggest, the most, and the best Catrinas, especially in Mexico and the U.S. Catrina impersonators abound. There are even Catrina fashion shows, and lavish, Catrina-themed balls and benefits for non-profit organizations.

Some artists have made a variety of Catrina figures over the years, such as the Albuquerque-based artist Brandon Maldonado (b. 1980). His Catrinas include La Catrina de la Noche, 2003, an op art-influenced ink on paper drawing, The Carriage, an oil painting from 2010 with Catrina riding in a traditional coach driven by a Catrín, and a satiric ink drawing called Gringo Souvenir of 2012. La Calavera Catrina, from 2018 (oil and gold leaf on panel) combines influences from traditional New Mexican religious statues and cubism with papel picado (cut paper) patterns. Maldonado's The Portrait of Doña Catrina (2019) is a reworking of a famous oil painting by Goya. His painting Cake Lady. (20 years of Muertos anniversary piece), 2021, humorously transforms a traditional dress into a cake. In an untitled Catrina Altar installed at Hollywood Forever Cemetery in Los Angeles in 2022, Maldonado transforms Catrina into a sculptural "death saint" that mourns victims of school shootings: Columbine (1999), Virginia Tech (2007), Sandy Hook (2012), Parkland (2018), and Uvalde (2022).

== Folk art ==
=== Purist ===
Catrinas are currently fashioned out of two- and three-dimensional materials. These include drawings, prints, paintings, and paper-mâché sculptures, Oaxacan wood carvings, polychromed clay figures, and barro negro black clay pottery. Catrina is often paired with a male dandy skeleton, known as a Catrín. The concept of art is also widely applied in various entertainment forms, including movies, highly exemplified by the film Coco (2017), animated series, video games, and music videos.

== Costume ==
"Catrin" and "Catrina" have become popular costumes during Day of the Dead celebrations in Mexico and elsewhere. They typically feature calavera (skull) make-up. The male counterpart to the Catrina, wears the same skull makeup and black clothes, often a formal suit with a top hat or a mariachi costume. A cane might also be part of the costume. Catrinas can be dressed in black, white, or bright colors.

Day of the Dead, circa 2014.

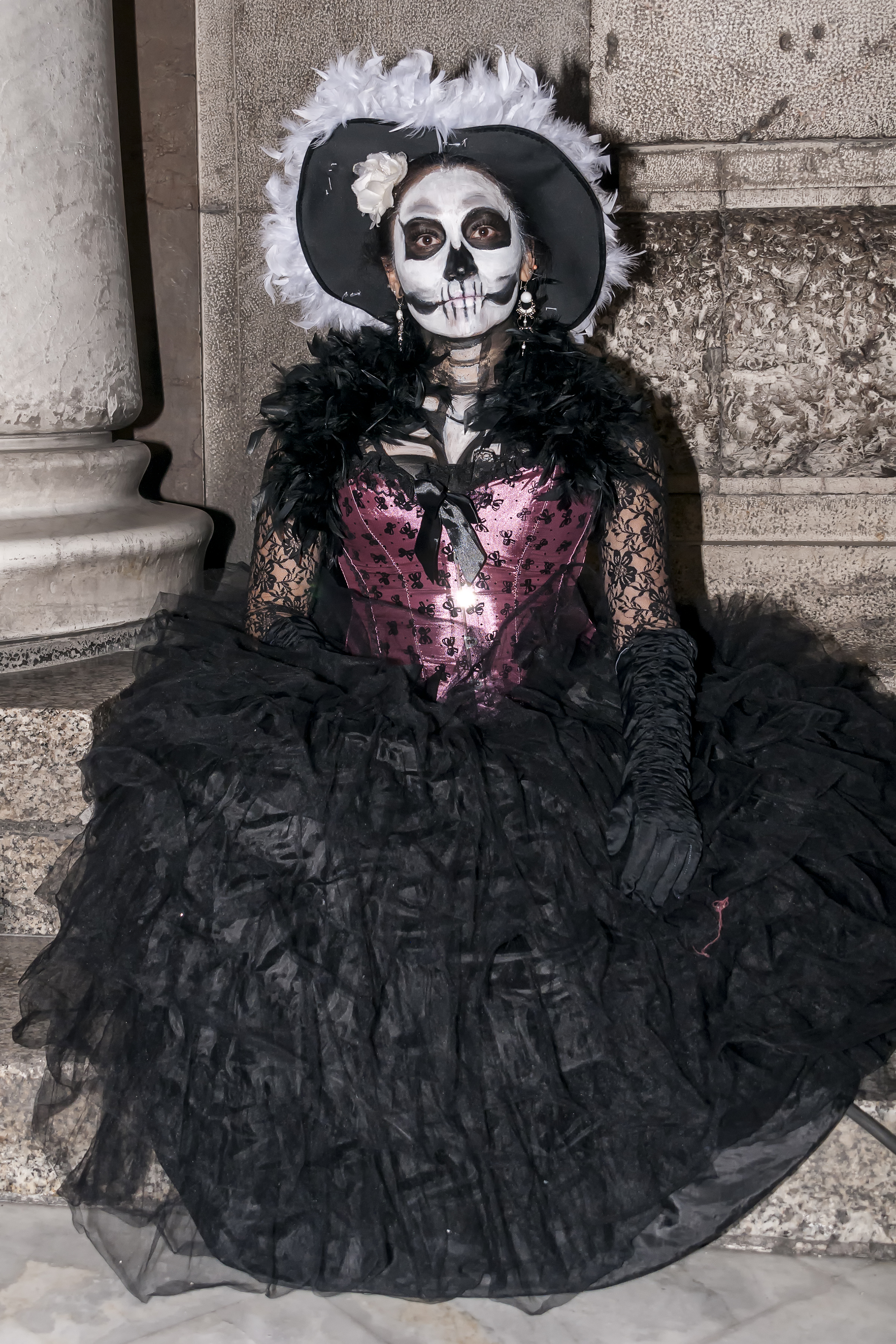
Woman dressed as a Catrina

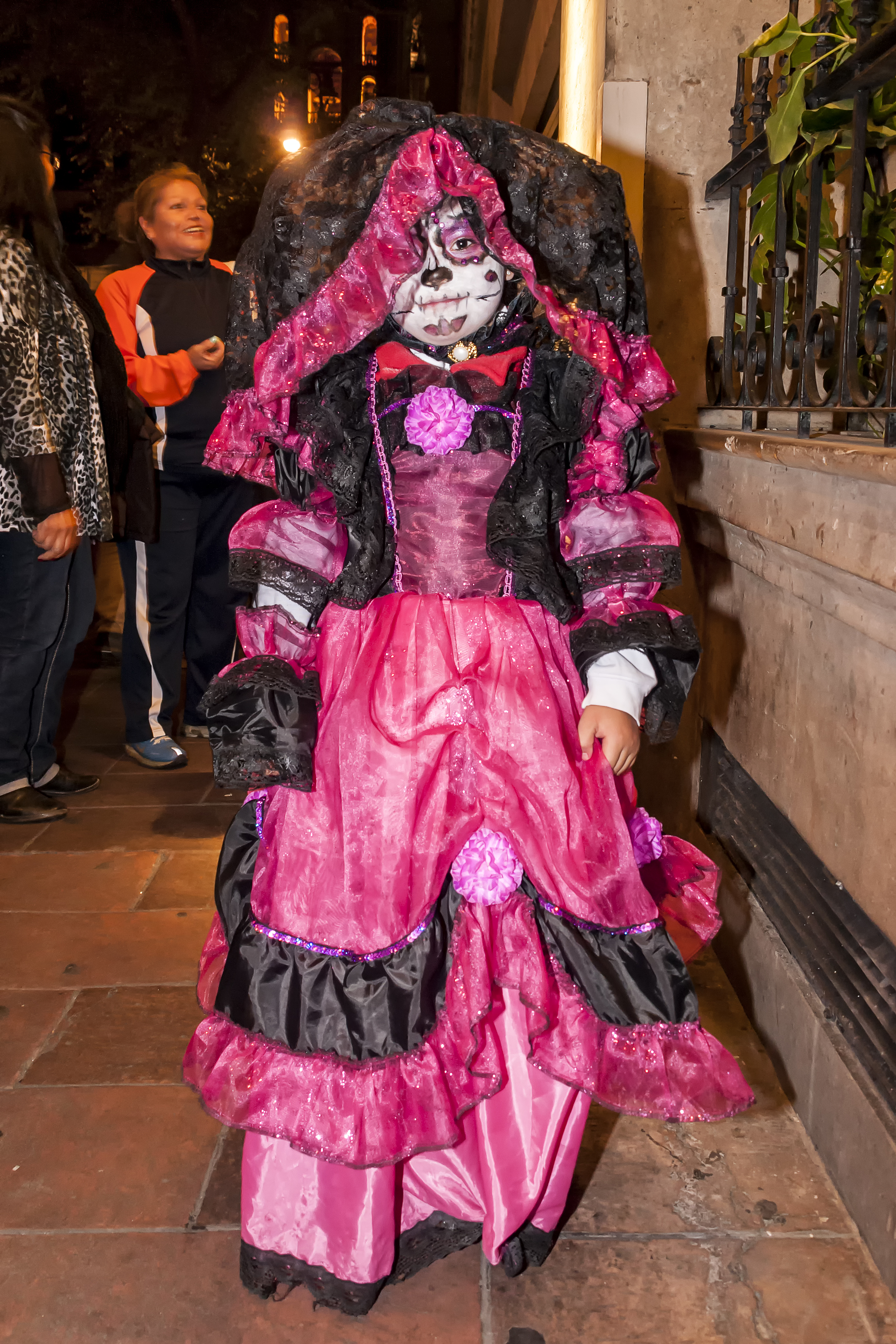
Girl dressed as a Catrina

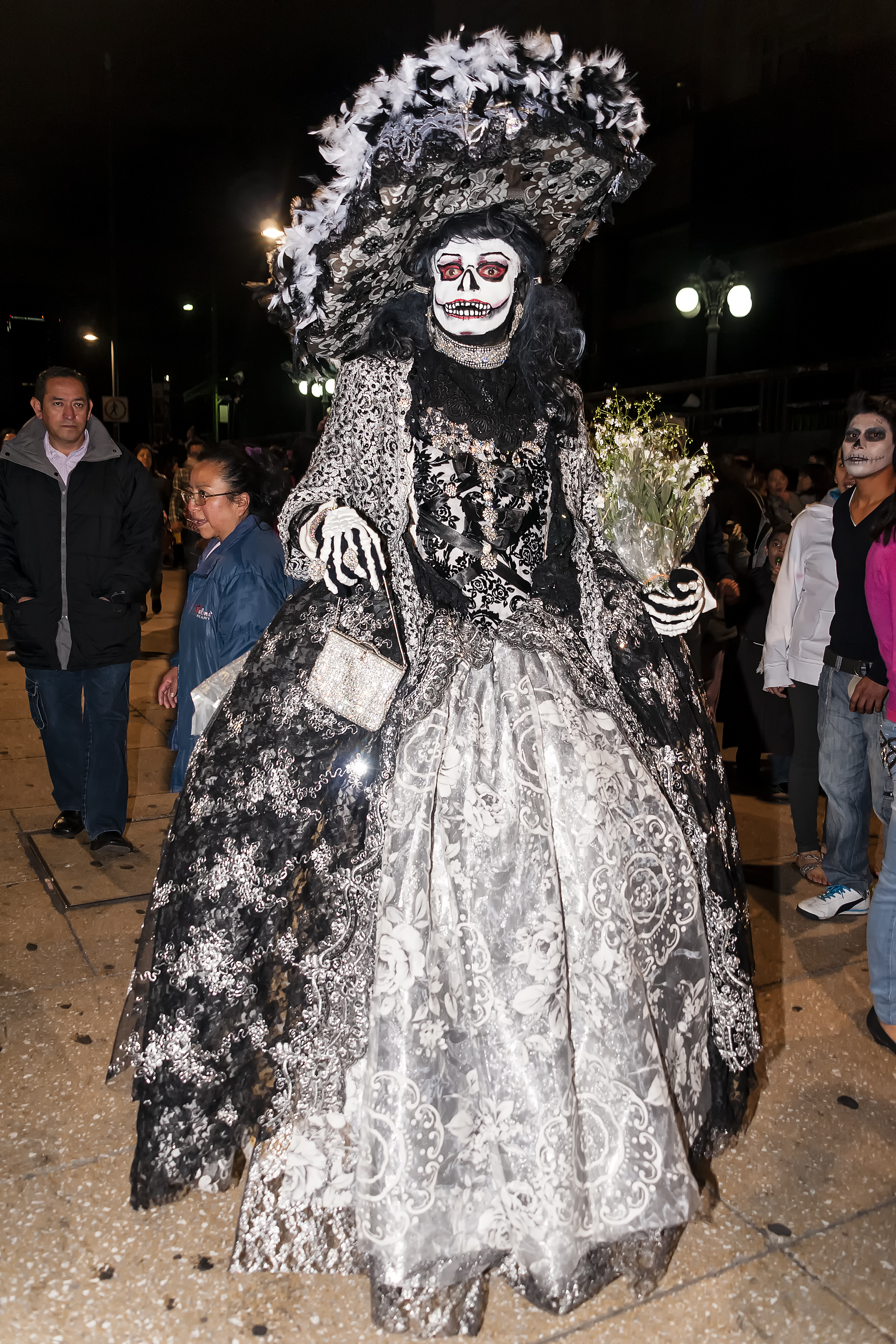
A Catrina

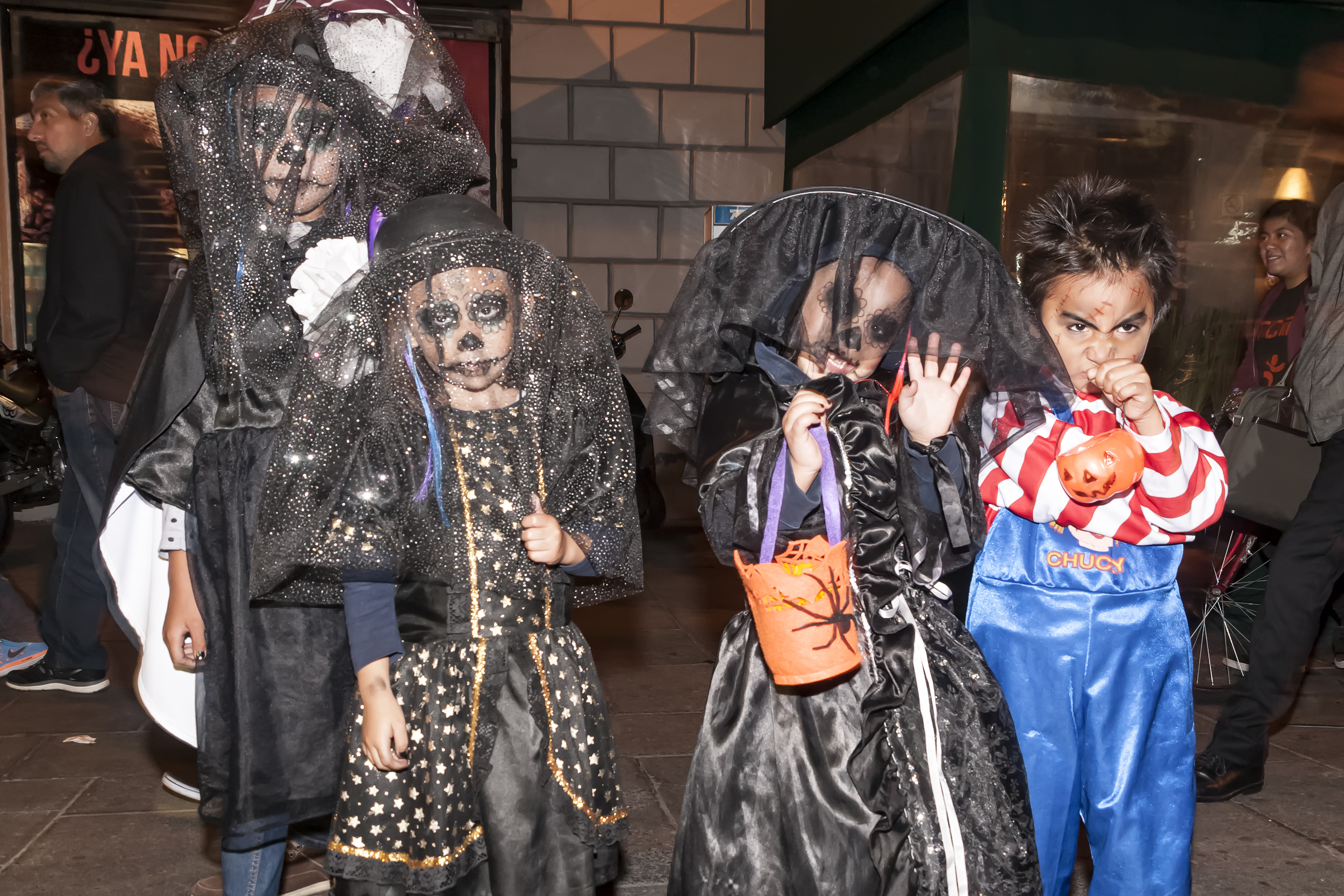
Three children dressed as Catrinas

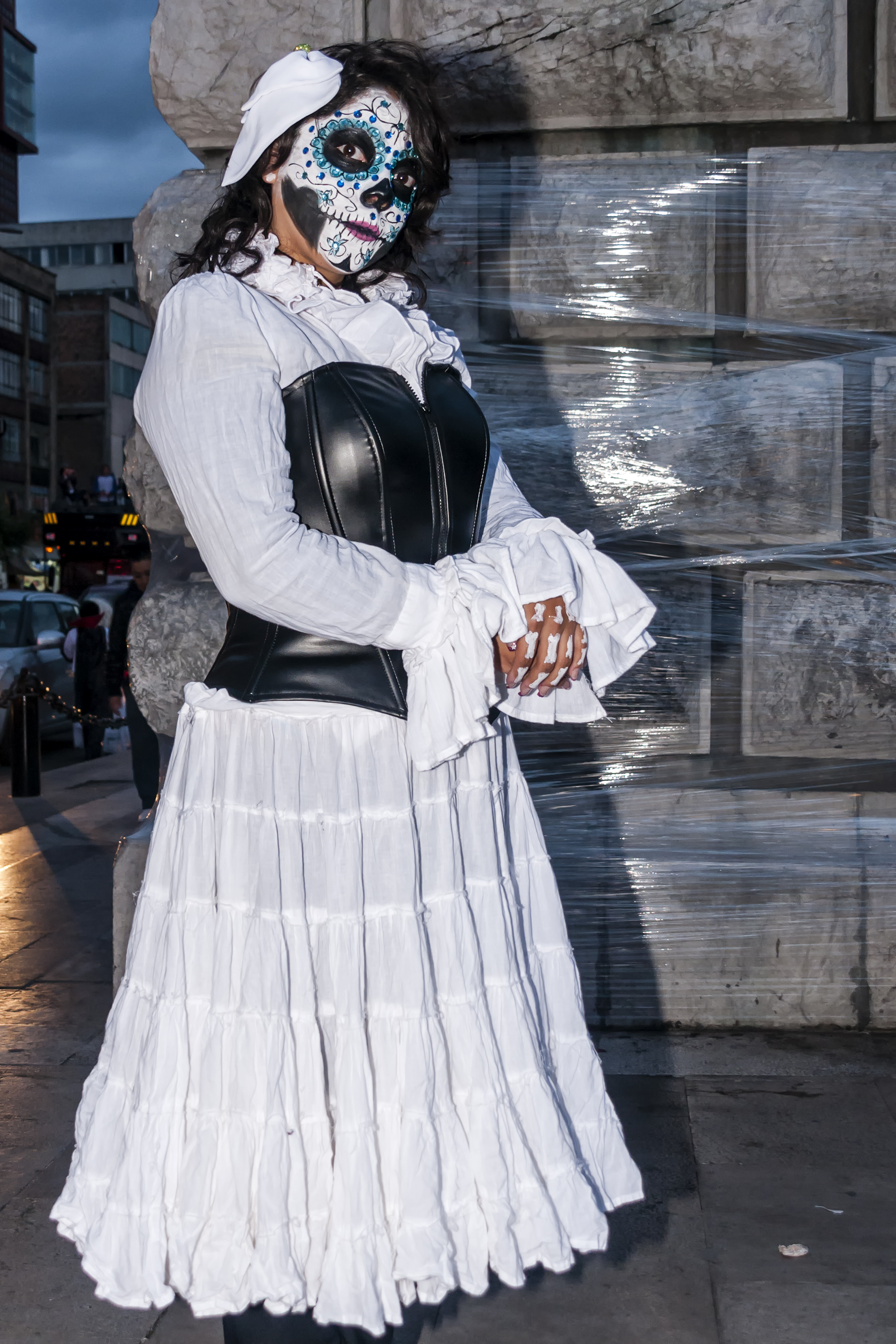
Woman dressed as a Catrina

== Gallery ==
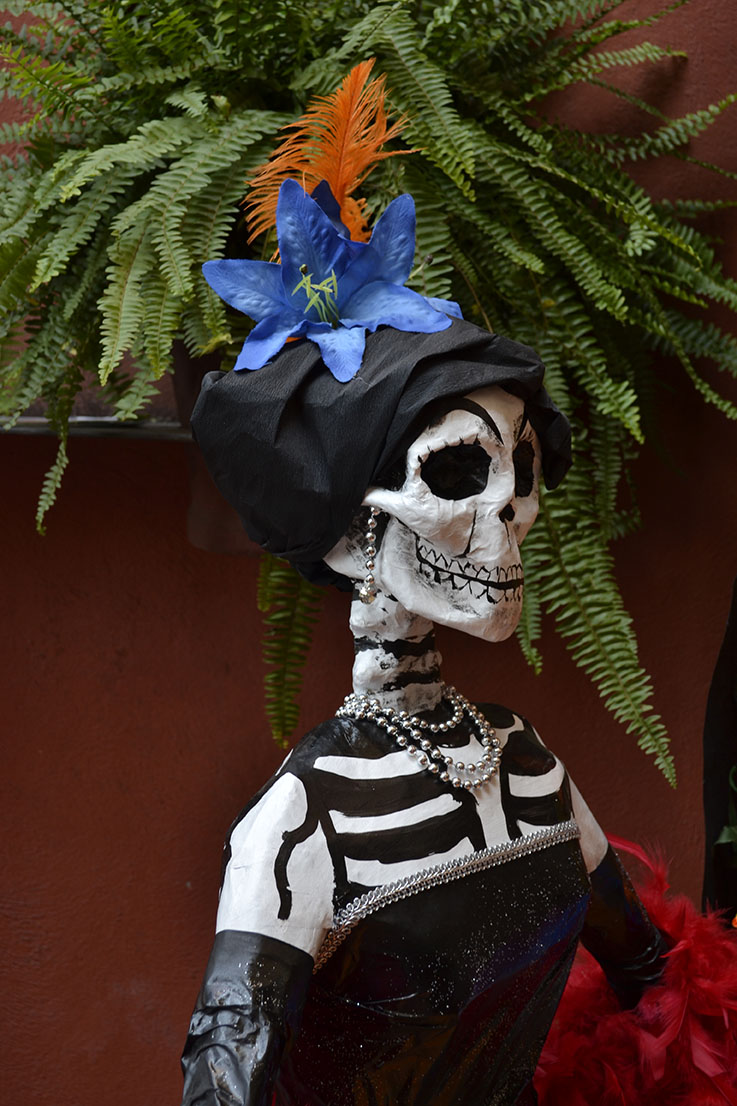
A Catrina inspired by María Félix as part of an ofrenda on the day of the dead festivities at San Ángel in November 2014

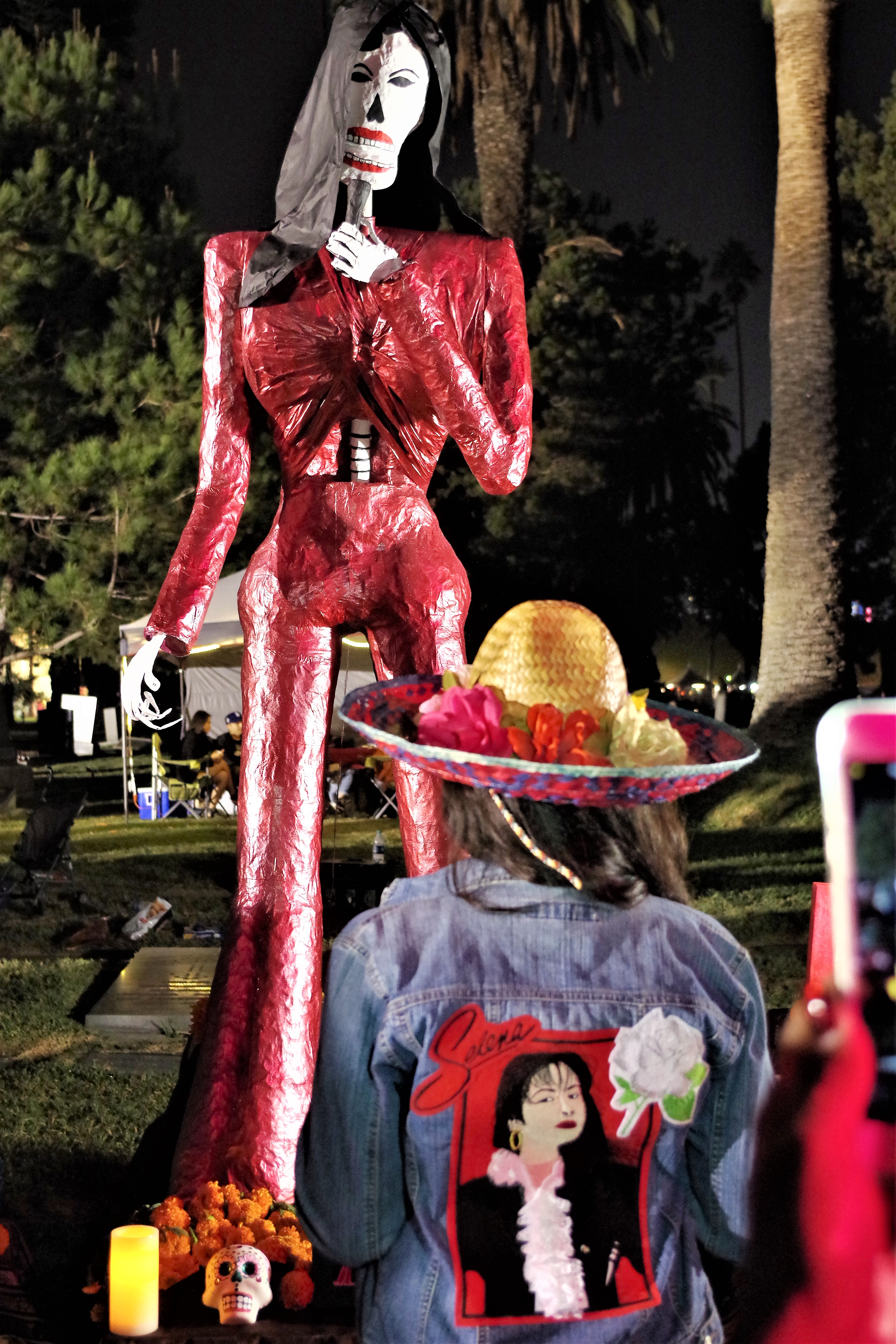
A Catrina inspired by Selena during celebrations of Day of the Dead at Hollywood Forever Cemetery, Los Angeles

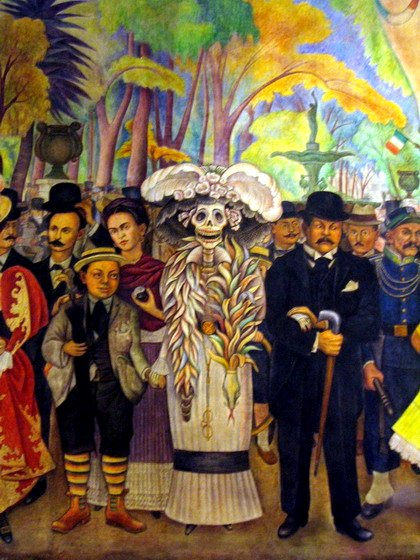
Center of Diego Rivera's wide mural Sueño de una Tarde Dominical en la Alameda Central (Dream of a Sunday Afternoon in the Alameda Central)

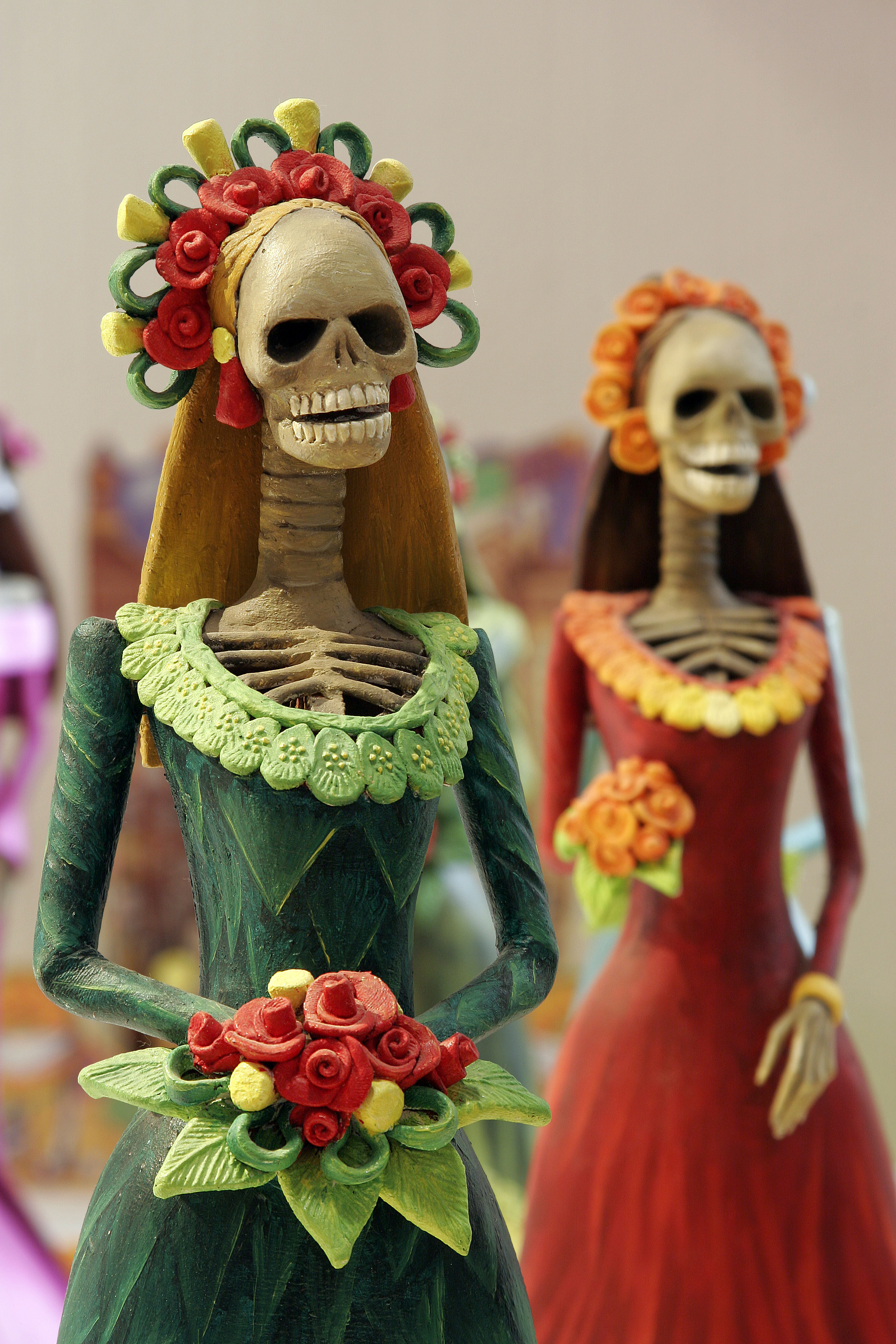
Modern representations of Catrina at the Museo de la Ciudad, León, Guanajuato, Mexico

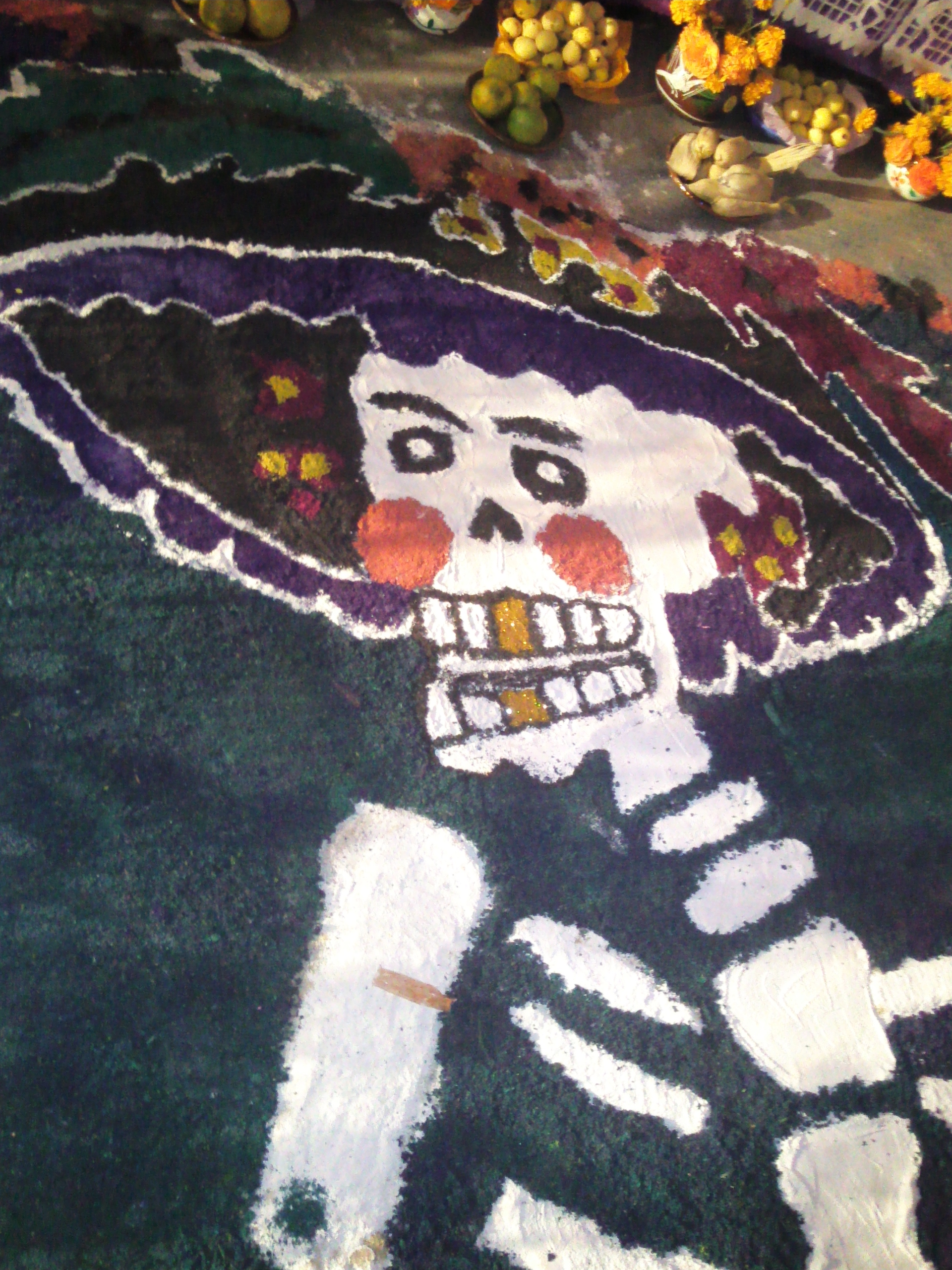
Image done in colored sawdust for Día de Muertos

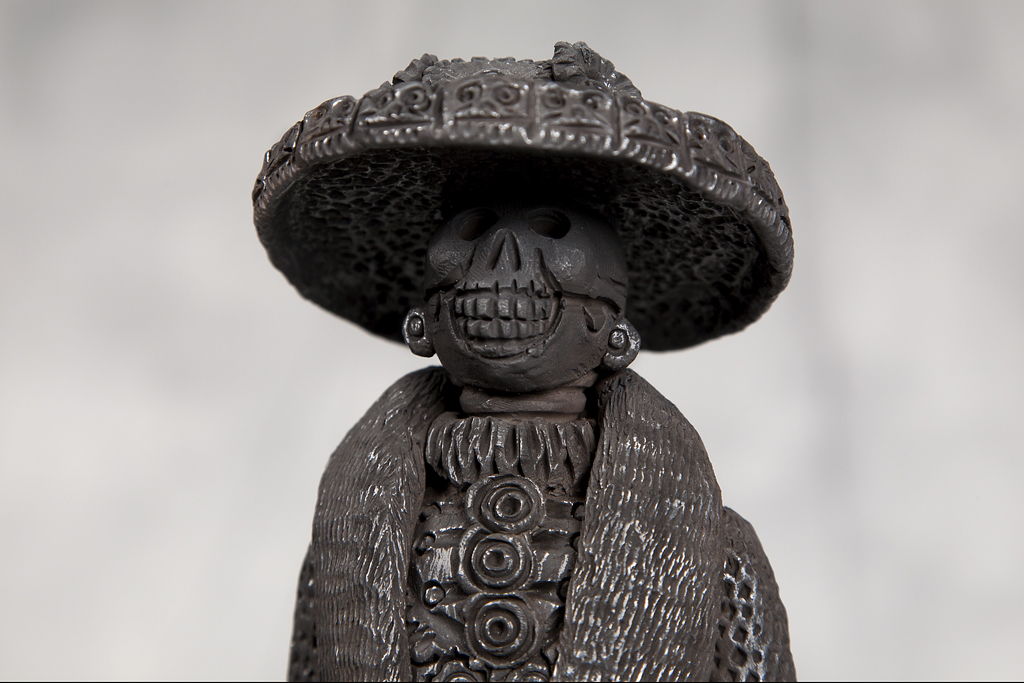
Detail of a Catrina figure in Barro negro pottery by artisan Carlomagno Pedro Martinez

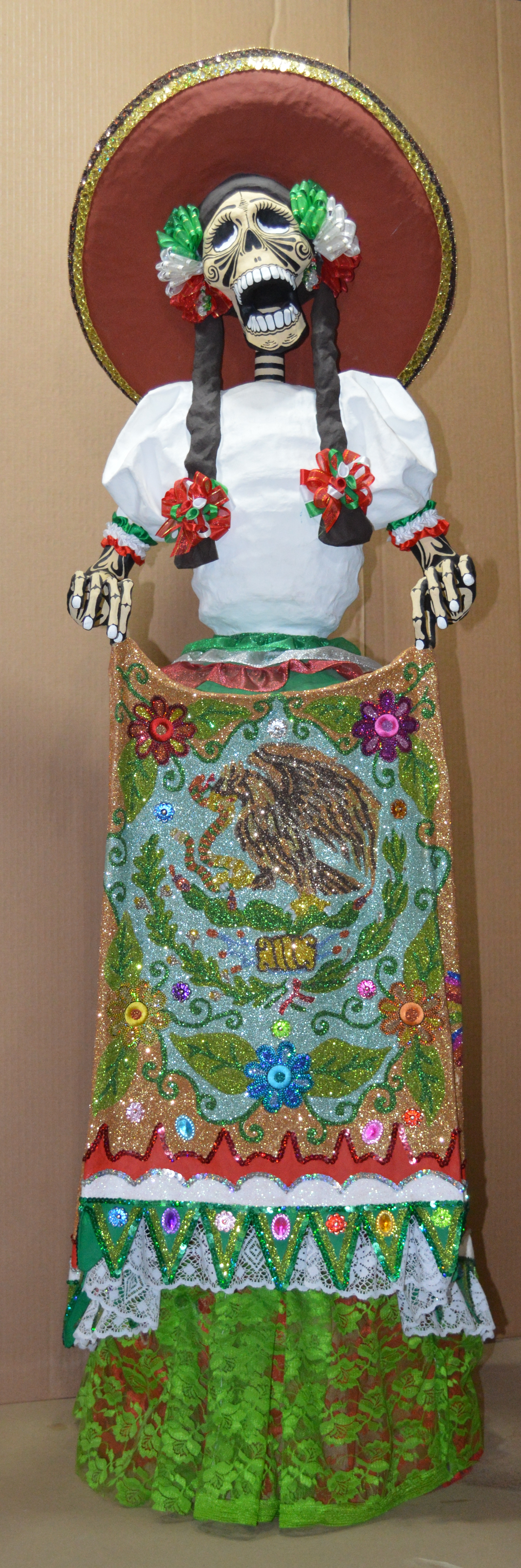
La Catrina in China Poblana dress, by Rodofo Villena Hernnandez in Puebla

A float featuring a Calavera Catrina on it during the 2016 Day of the Dead Parade, Mexico City

A 33.4 meter tall Catrina in the Zócalo, Mexico City

== See also ==
- All Saints Day
- Danse Macabre
- Day of the Dead
- Death (personification)
- Ghosts in Mexican culture
- Memento mori
- Santa Muerte
- Skeleton (undead)
- Hone-onna
