= José Guadalupe Posada =

Mexican political lithographer (1852–1914)

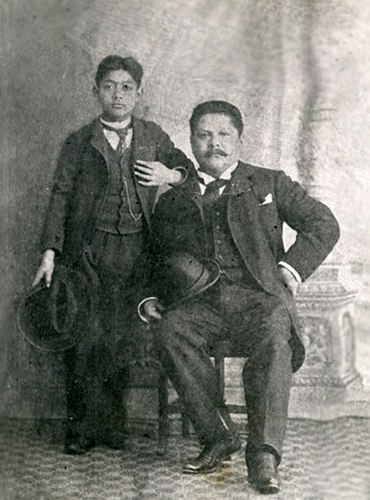
- Born: 2 February 1852; Aguascalientes City, Mexico
- Died: 20 January 1913 (aged 60)
- Occupation: Lithographer
- Known for: Calaveras
- Spouse: María de Jesús Vela (m. 1875)

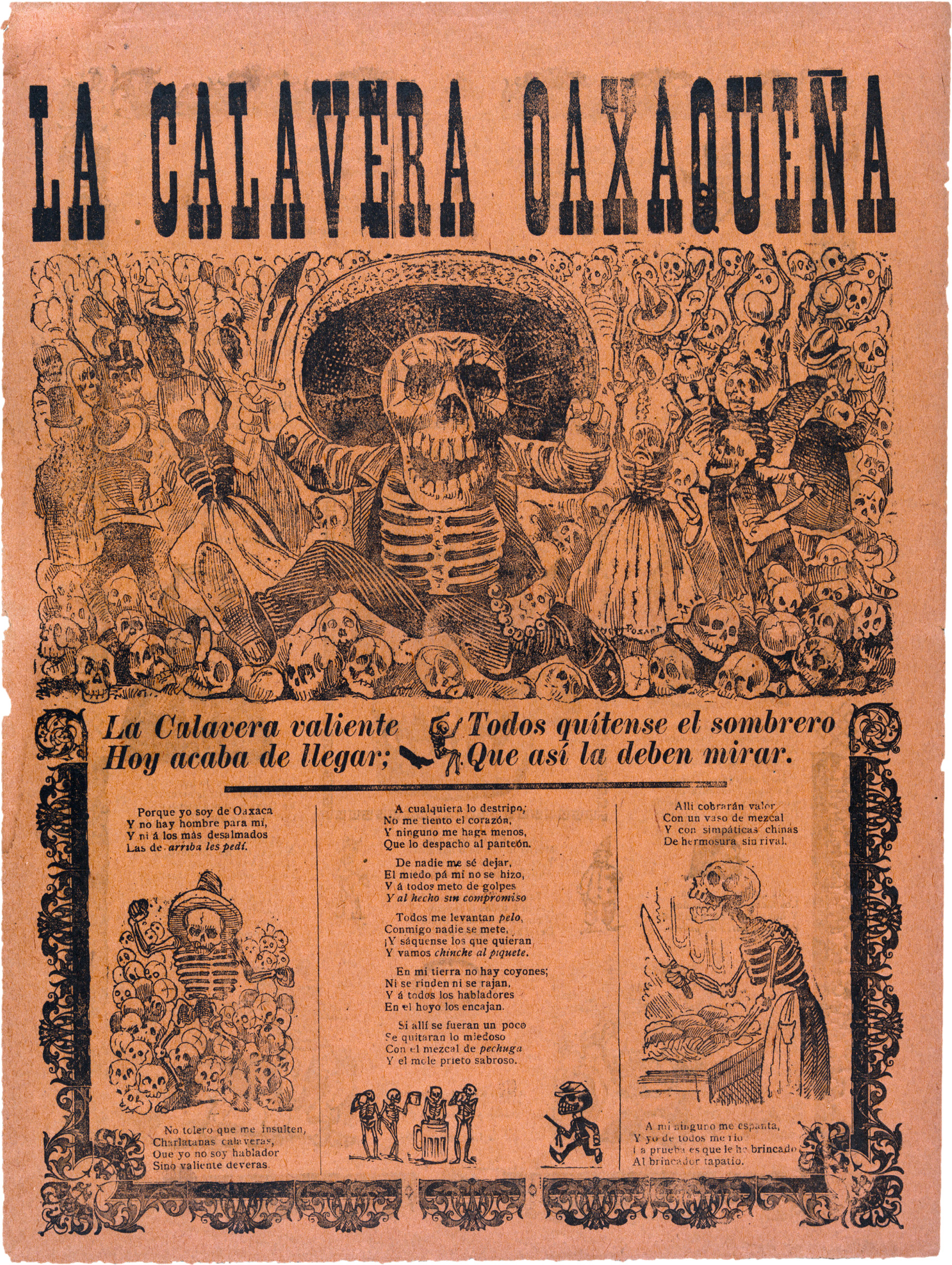
Calavera oaxaqueña, 1903, one of his many broadsheets.

José Guadalupe Posada Aguilar (2 February 1852 – 20 January 1913) was a Mexican political printmaker who used relief printing to produce popular illustrations. His work has influenced numerous Latin American artists and cartoonists because of its satirical acuteness and social engagement. He used skulls, calaveras, and bones to show political and cultural critiques. Among his most enduring works is La Calavera Catrina.

== Early life and education ==
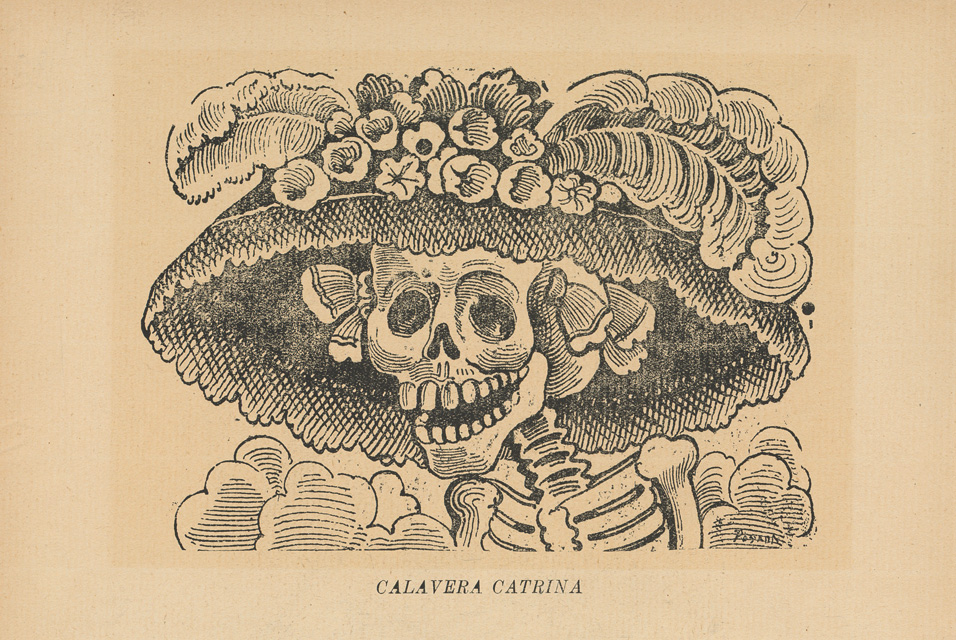
Posada's La Calavera Catrina.

Posada was born in Aguascalientes on 2 February 1852. His father was Germán Posada Serna and his mother was Petra Aguilar Portillo. Posada was one of eight children and received his early education from his older brother Cirilo, a country school teacher. Posada's brother taught him reading, writing, and drawing. He then joined La Academia Municipal de Dibujo de Aguascalientes (the Municipal Drawing Academy of Aguascalientes). Later, in 1868, as a teenager he apprenticed in the workshop of Jose Trinidad Pedroza, who taught him lithography and engraving.

In 1871, before he was out of his teens, his career began with a job as the political cartoonist for a local newspaper in Aguascalientes, El Jicote ("The Bumblebee"), where his first cartoons were published. The newspaper closed after 11 issues, reportedly because one of Posada's cartoons had offended a powerful local politician. In 1872, Posada and Pedroza dedicated themselves to commercial lithography in León, Guanajuato. While in Leon, Posada opened his own workshop and worked as a lithography teacher at the local secondary school. He also continued his work with lithographs and wood engravings. In 1873, he returned to his home in Aguascalientes City where he married María de Jesús Vela in 1875. The following year he purchased the printing press from Pedroza.

From 1875 to 1888, Posada continued to collaborate with several newspapers in León, including La Gacetilla, el Pueblo Caótico and La education. He survived the great flood of León on 18 June 1888, of which he published several lithographs representing the tragedy in which more than two hundred and fifty corpses were found and more than 1,400 people were reported missing.

At the end of 1888, he moved to Mexico City, where he learned the craft and technique of engraving in lead and zinc. He collaborated with the newspaper La Patria Ilustrada and the Revisita de Mexico until the early months of 1890.

== Career as artist ==
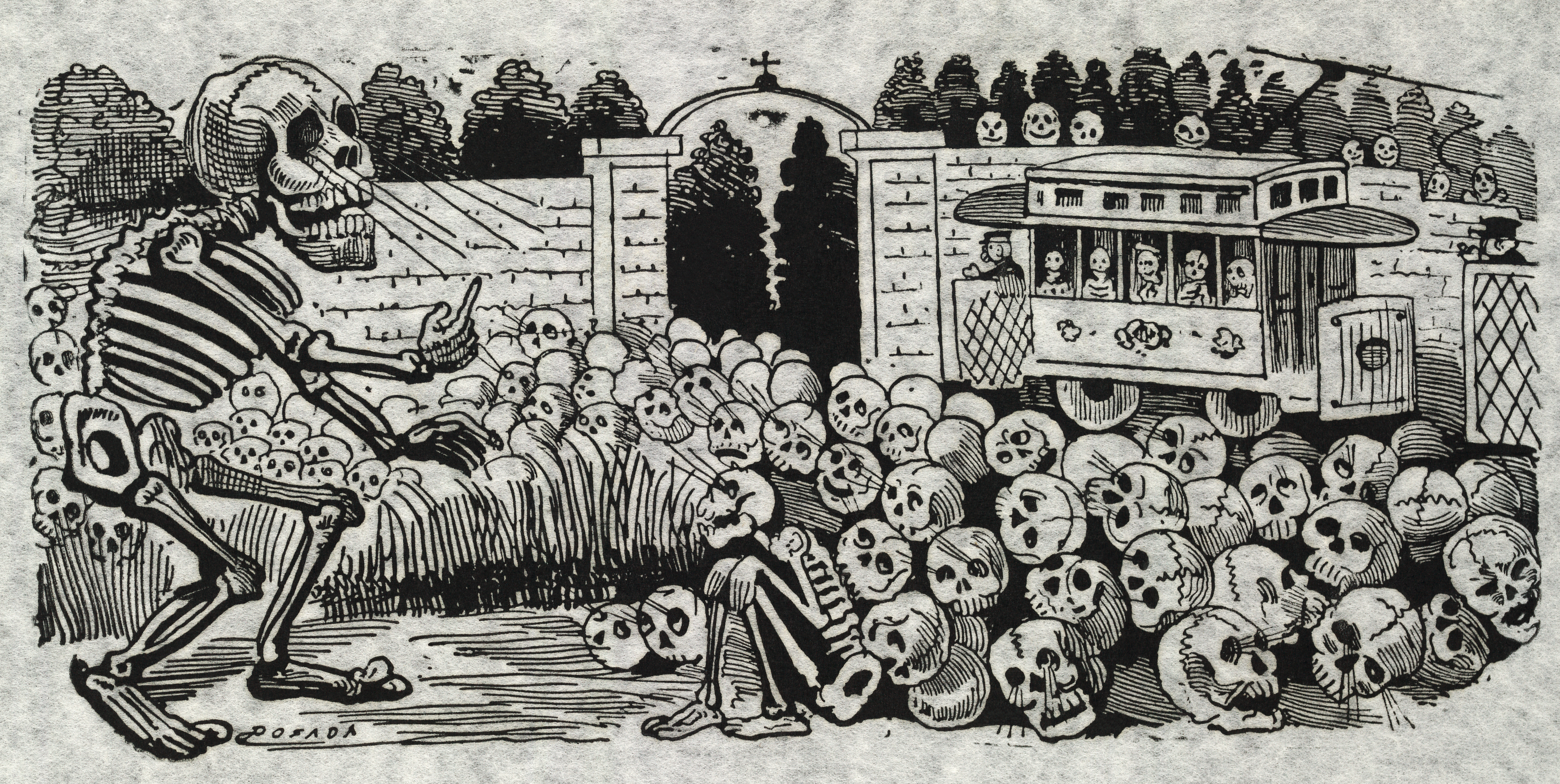
Reproduction of the restored Gran calavera eléctrica (Grand electric skull), by Posada 1900–1913

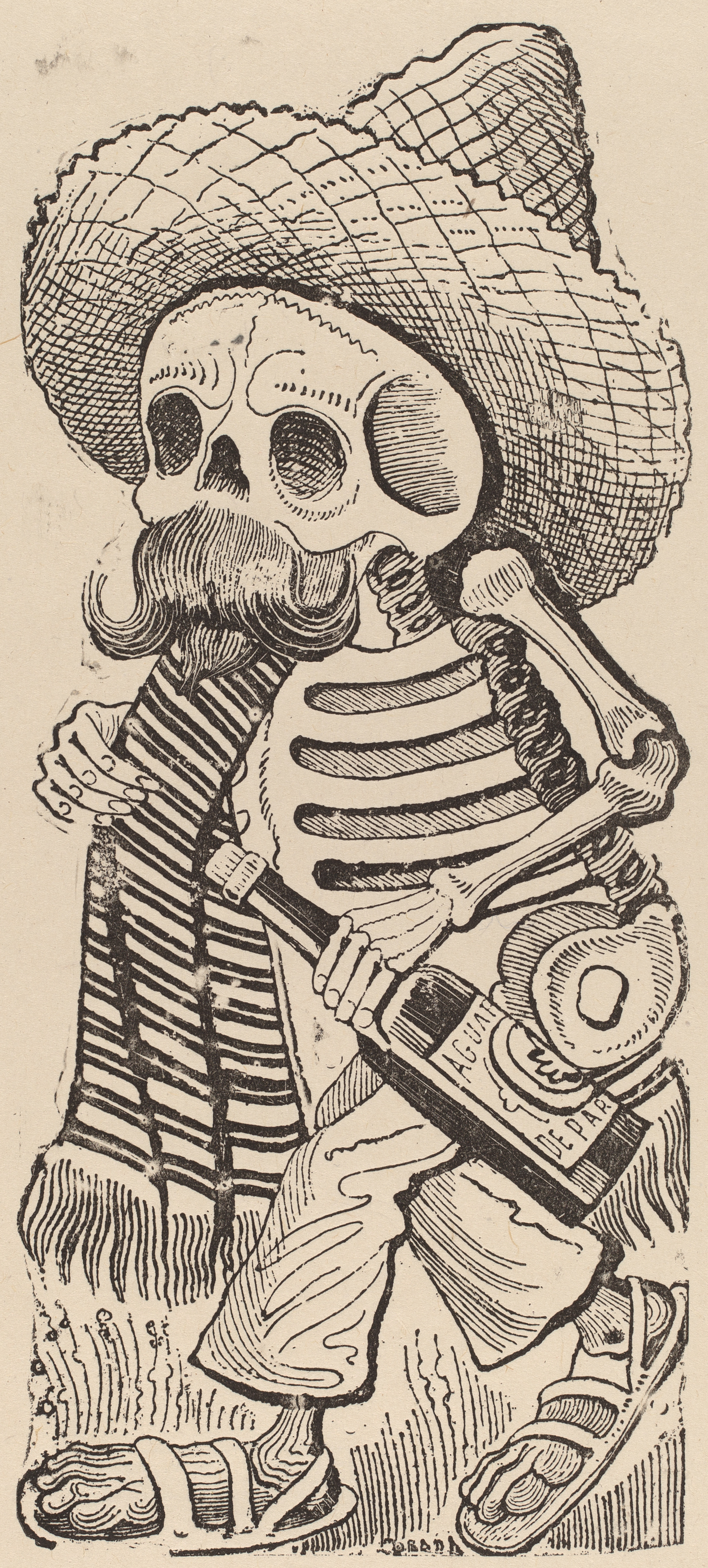
The Calavera Maderista, in the Museo Nacional de Arte, Mexico City

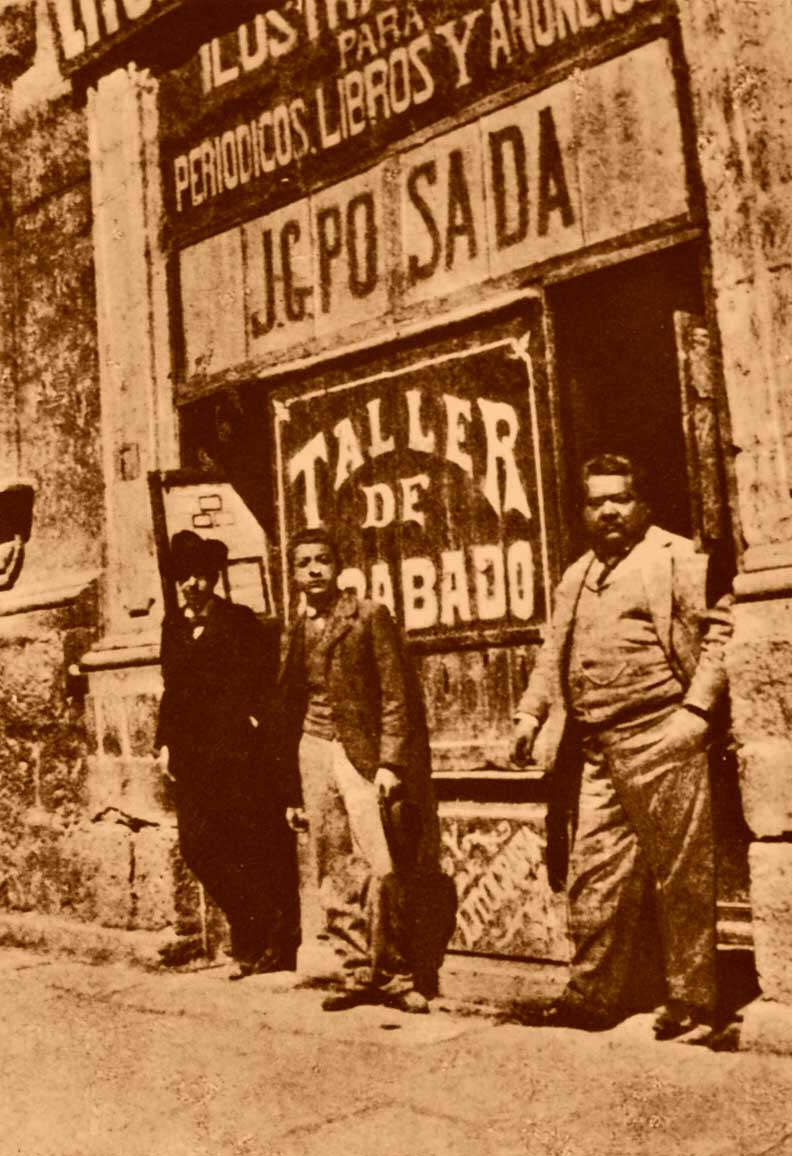
The workshop of Posada, Mexico, ca 1900

He began to work with Antonio Vanegas Arroyo, until he was able to establish his own lithographic workshop. From then on Posada undertook work that earned him popular acceptance and admiration for his sense of humor and propensity concerning the quality of his work. In his broad and varied work, Posada portrayed beliefs, the daily lifestyles of popular groups, the abuses of government, and the exploitation of the common people. He illustrated the famous skulls, along with other illustrations that became popular as they were distributed to various newspapers and periodicals.

In 1883, following his success, he was hired as a teacher of lithography at the local Preparatory School. The shop flourished until 1888 when a disastrous flood hit the city. He subsequently moved to Mexico City. His first regular employment in the capital was with La Patria Ilustrada, whose editor was Ireneo Paz, the grandfather of the later famed writer Octavio Paz. He later joined the staff of a publishing firm owned by Antonio Vanegas Arroyo and while at this firm he created a prolific number of book covers and illustrations. Much of his work was also published in sensationalistic broadsides depicting various current events.

From the outbreak of the Mexican Revolution in 1910 until his death in 1913, Posada worked tirelessly in the press. The works he completed in his press during this time allowed him to develop his artistic prowess as a draftsman, engraver and lithographer. At the time he continued to make satirical illustrations and cartoons featured in the magazine, El Jicote. He played a crucial role in the government during the presidency of Francisco I Madero and during the campaign of Emiliano Zapata.

== Notable works ==
Posada's best known works are his calaveras. His most famous and influential work is the La Calavera Catrina, which was first published posthumously in a 1913 broadside. Catrina was probably intended as a satirical portrait of Mexican elites who were imitating European fashions, but the text, which was not written by the artist, satirized working class vendors of chickpeas. Posada's Catrina image appeared in several other broadsides. It was elaborated into a full figure by the muralist Diego Rivera. Catrina is now the most widespread image associated with the Day of the Dead.

== Later life and death ==
Largely forgotten by the end of his life, José Guadalupe Posada died in 1913 of gastroenteritis. Three of his neighbors certified his death, although only one of them knew his full name. He reportedly died penniless and was ultimately buried in an unmarked pauper's grave.

== Legacy ==
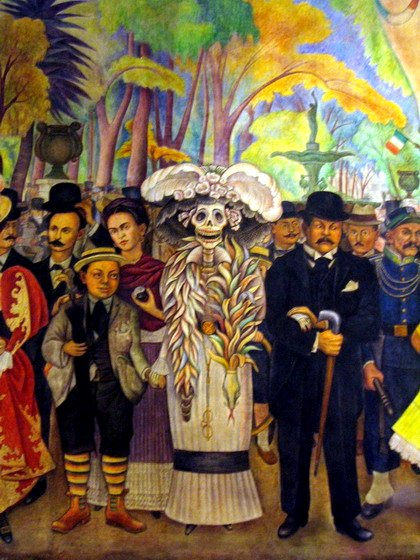
Rivera's "Sunday Afternoon in Alameda Park" mural (1946–1947), showing his full figured Catrina image standing beside Posada (dressed in a black suit) and a self-portrait as a boy.

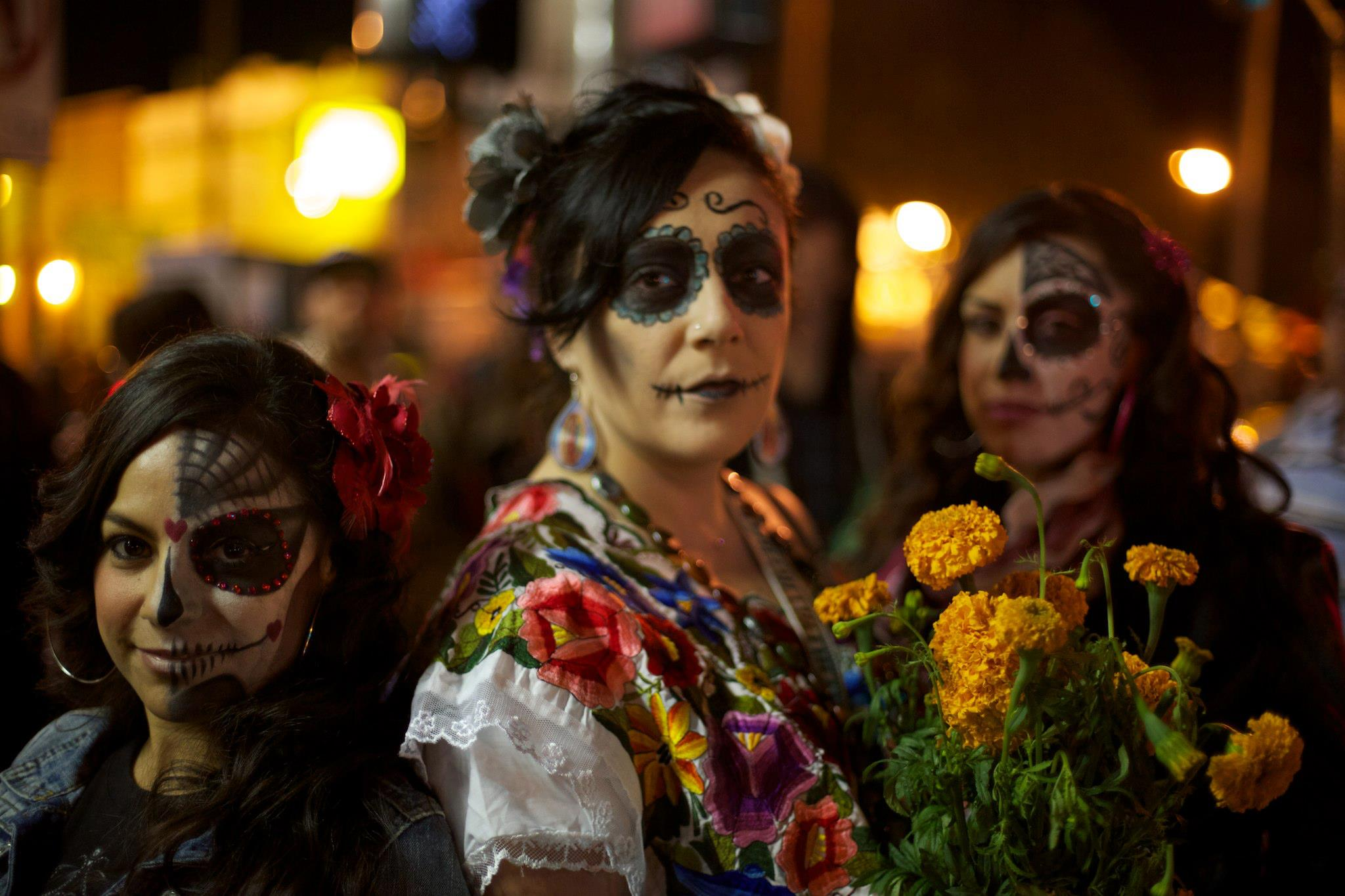
The Day of the Dead is usually celebrated in Central and Southern Mexico during the chilly days of 1 & 2 November

Academics have estimated that during his long career, Posada produced 20,000 plus images for broadsheets, pamphlets and chapbooks. Posada was studied by key figures of Mexican muralism, including Jean Charlot, Diego Rivera, and José Clemente Orozco, who created national art. Rivera advanced the false belief that Posada was a proto-revolutionary artist.

Though Posada has usually been characterized as someone who utilized traditional craft techniques, he likely used photomechanical processes and deliberately made distressed-looking images in order to appeal to his downscale clientele. Frida Kahlo spoke "almost reverentially" of Posada and posted some of his prints in her hotel room in New York City in 1933.

In the 1920s, the French born Mexican artist Jean Charlot was the first to popularize Posada's broadsides as art. In 1929 Anita Brenner's book Idols Behind Altars used Posada's illustrations. Brenner called Posada a prophet and linked him to the Mexica, peasants and workers. The US author Frances Toor promoted Posada as folklore with her 1930 book Posada: Grabador Mexicano, the first monograph on Posada. Rivera commented on 406 prints by Posada in the foreword for the book.

When Leopoldo Méndez returned from the Cultural Missions programs of the Mexican Secretariat of Public Education in Jalisco, Méndez got to know about Posada's prints and adopted him as artistic and cultural hero. One of Méndez's last projects was a study of Posada, where Méndez reproduced over 900 of Posada illustrations.

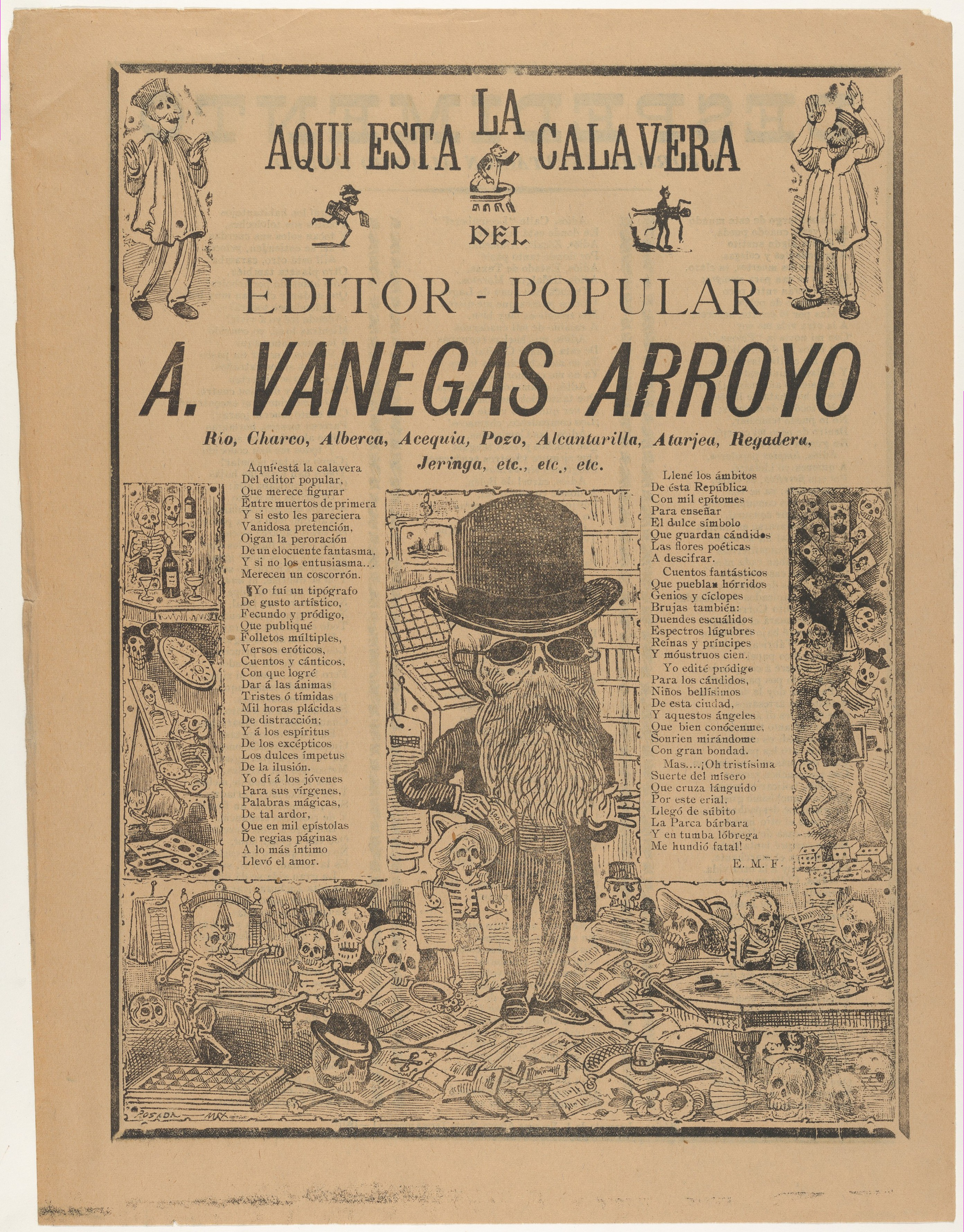
The skeleton of the people’s editor (Antonio Vanegas Arroyo)

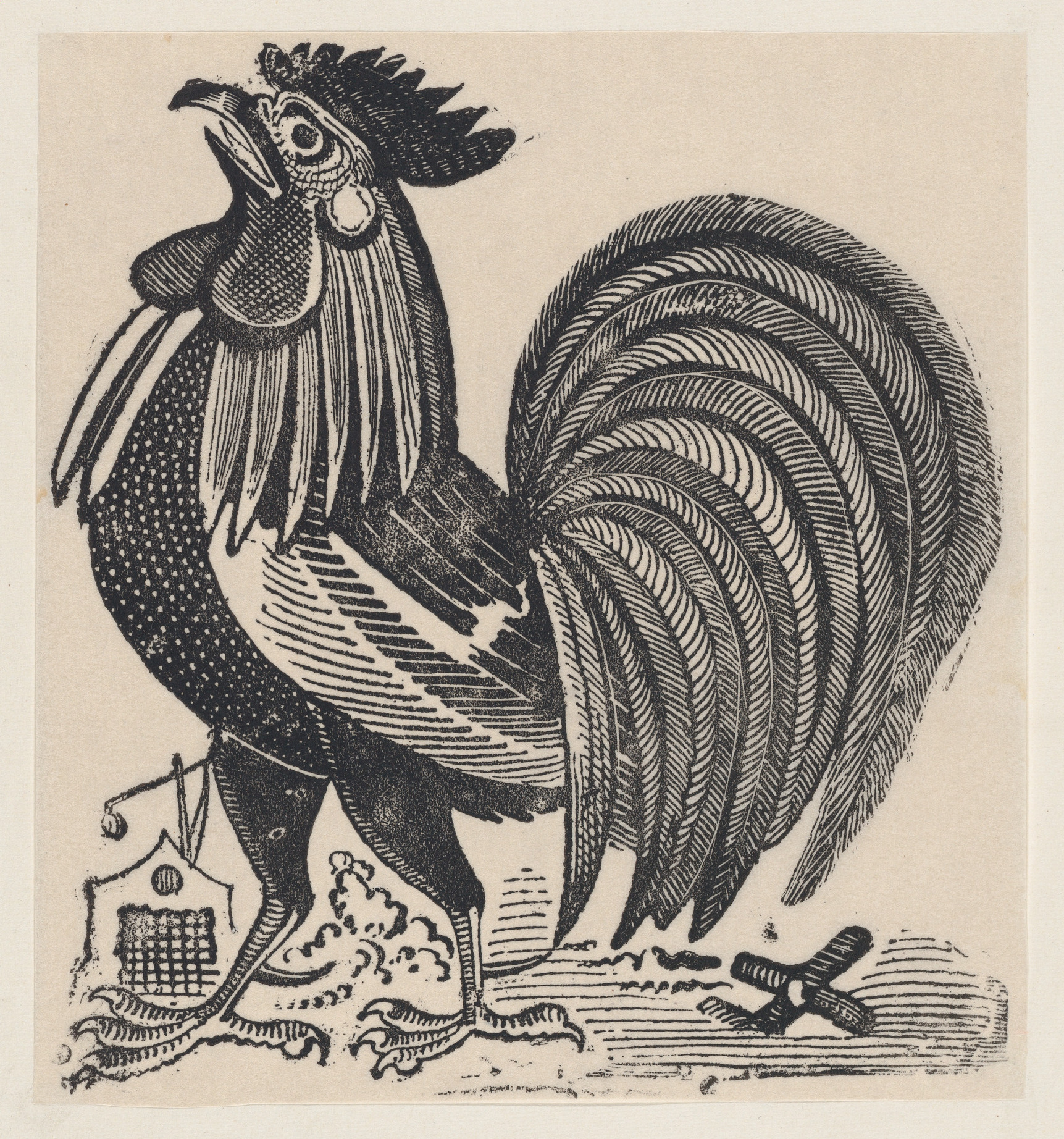

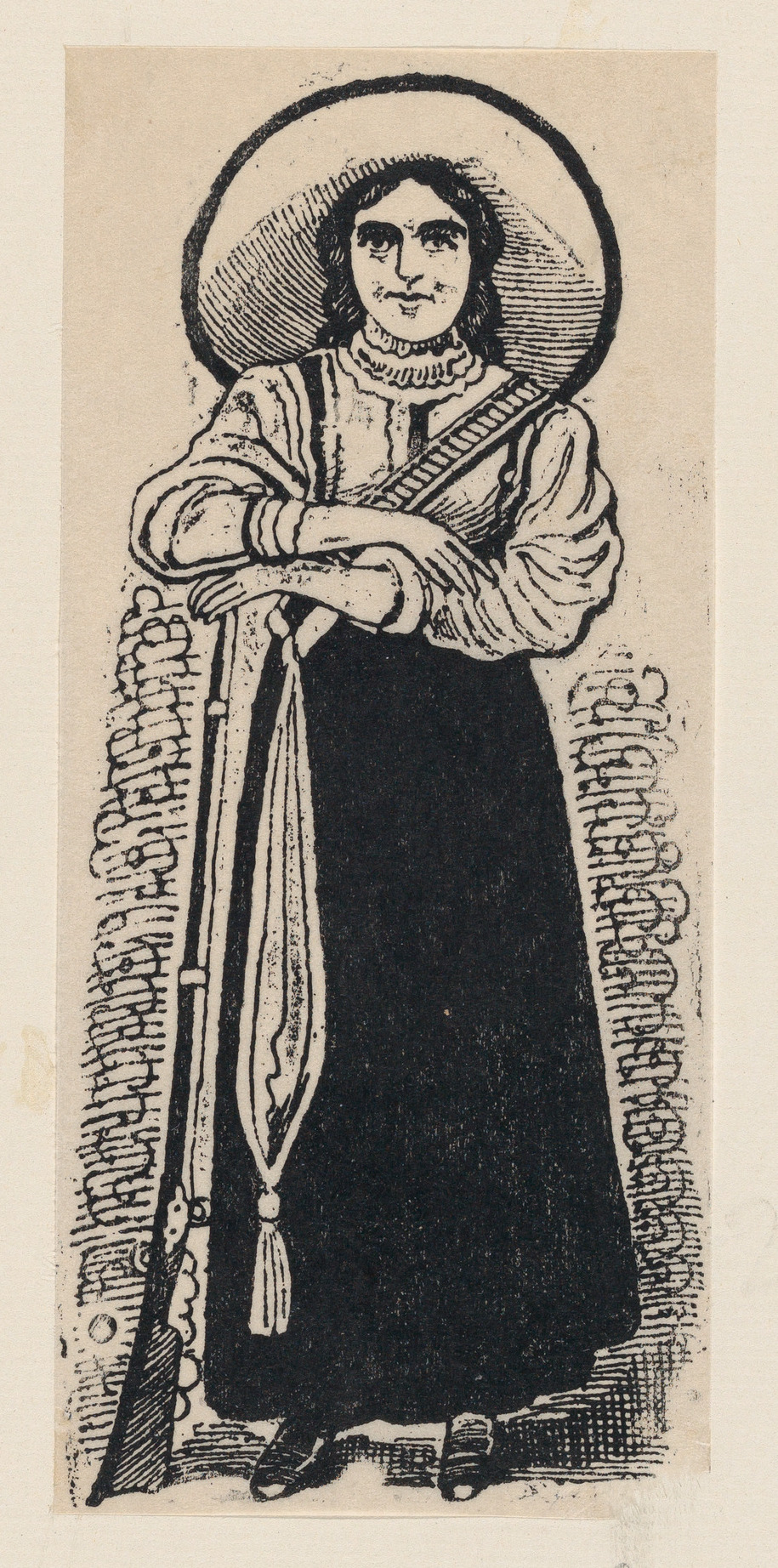

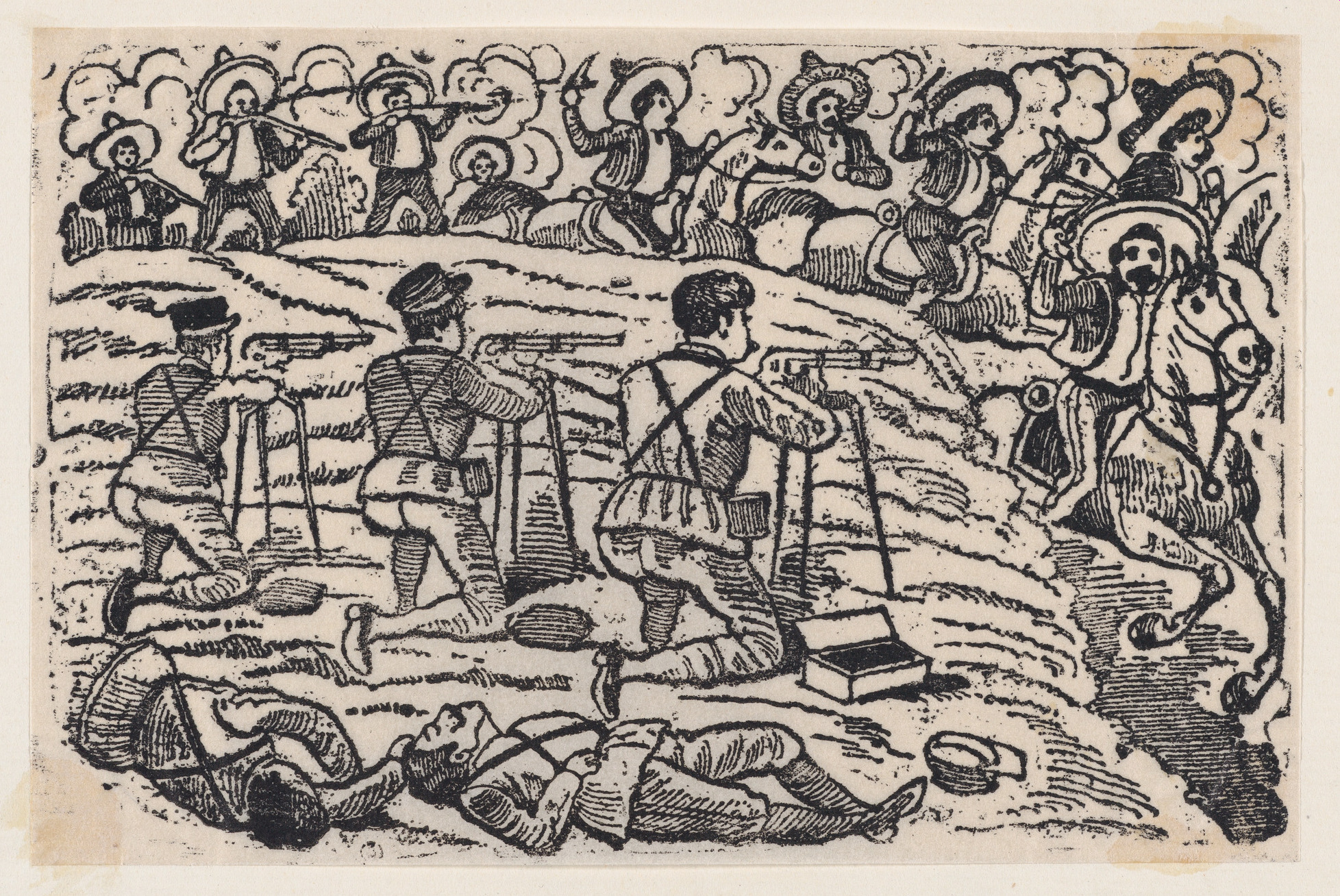

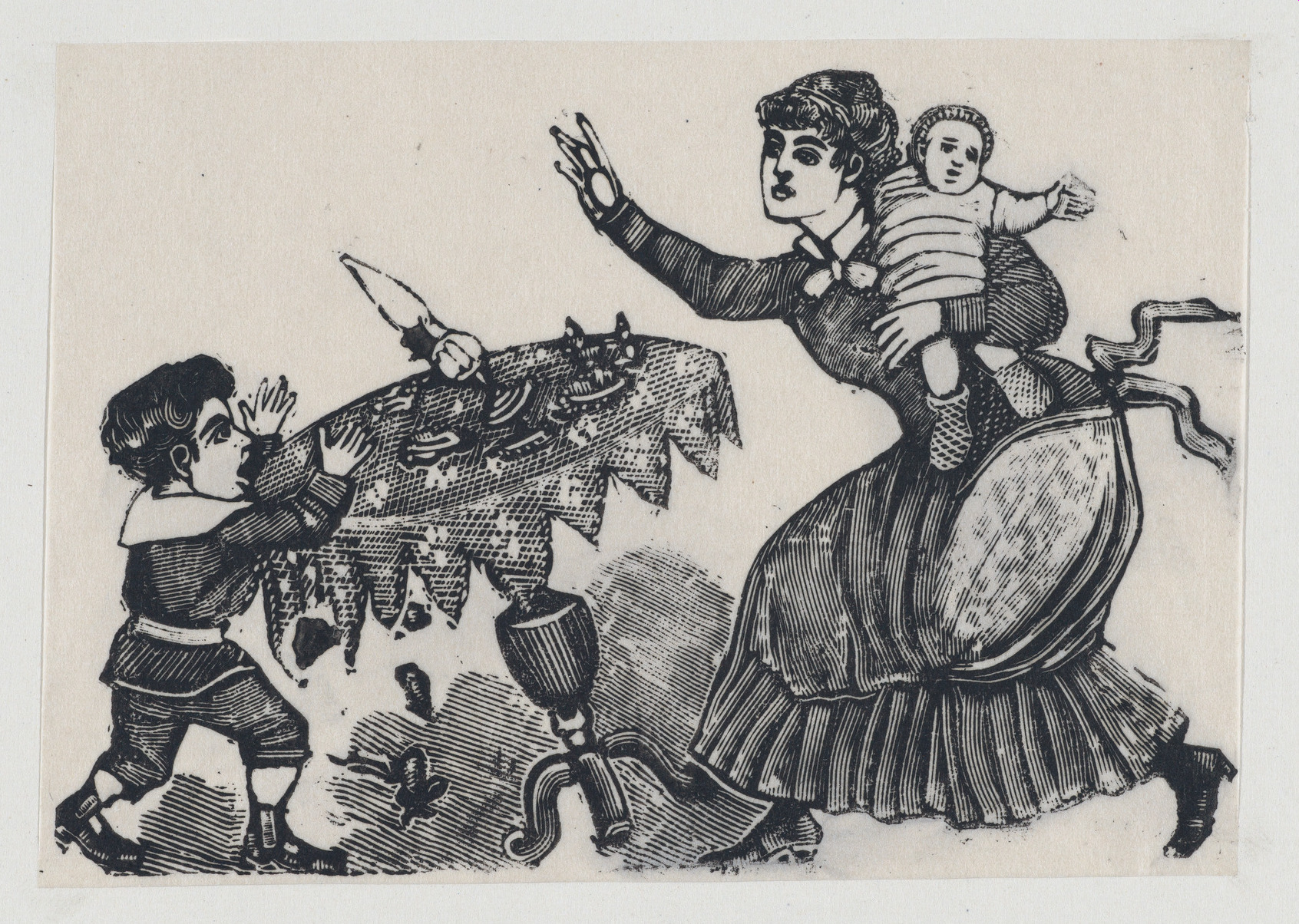

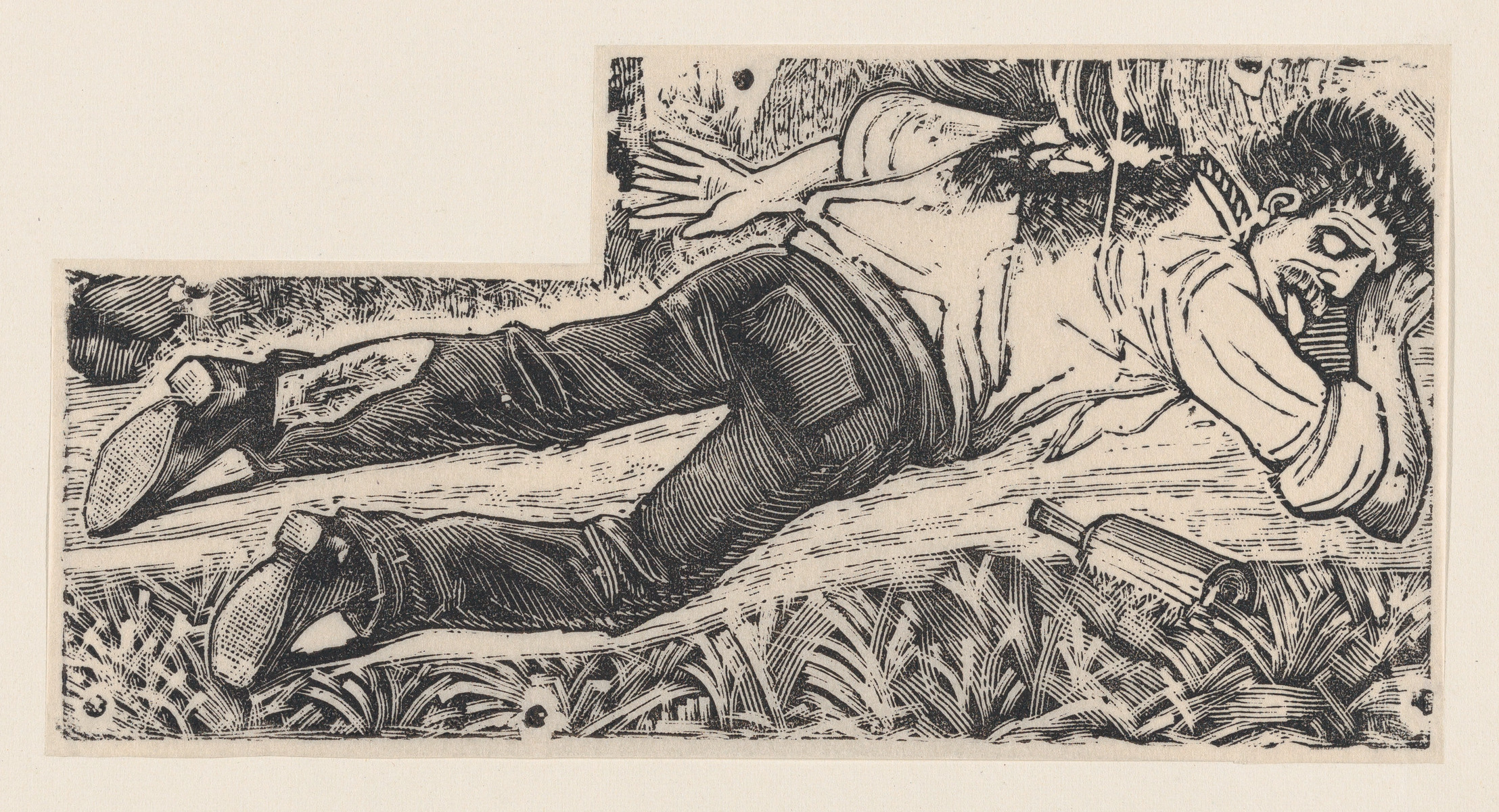

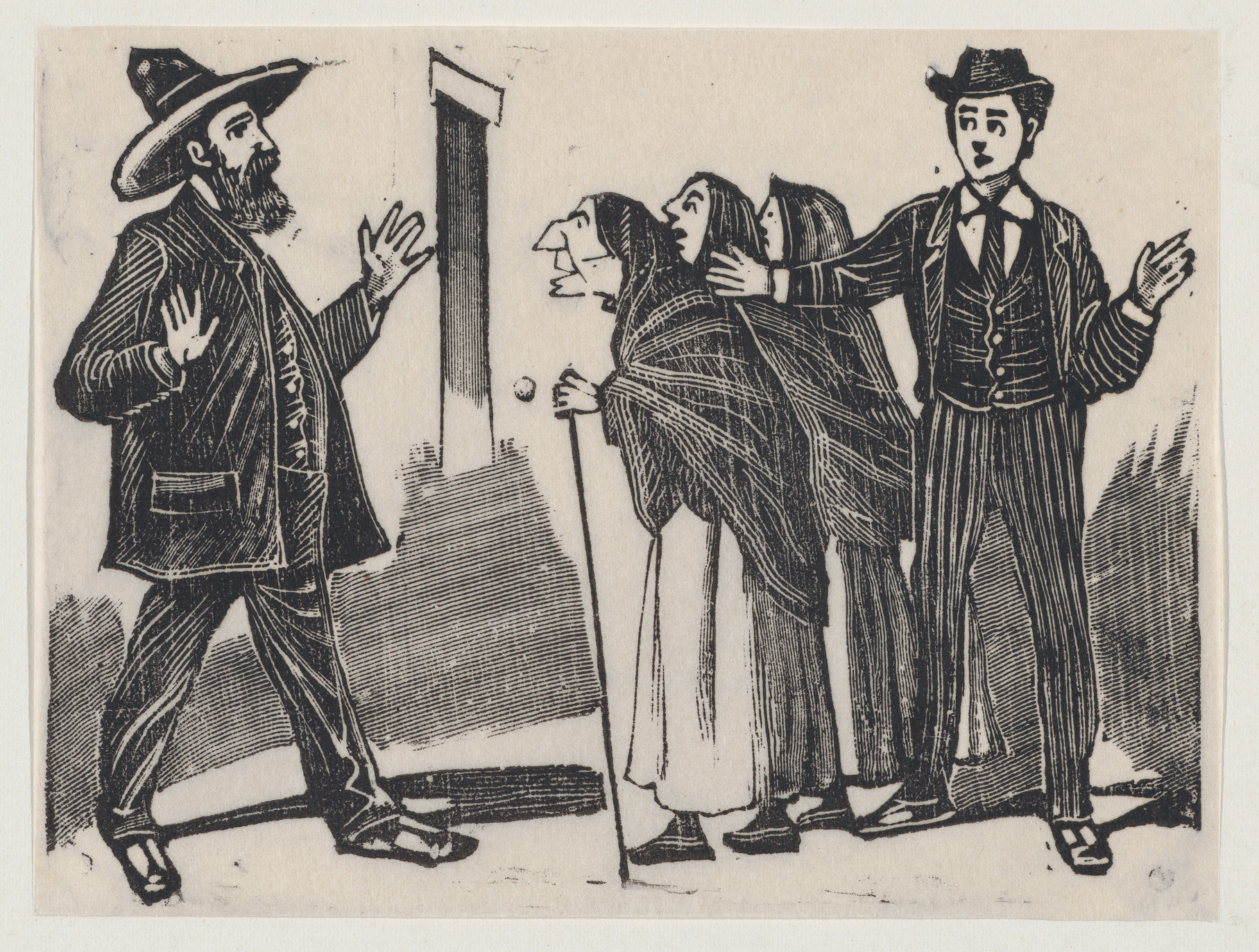

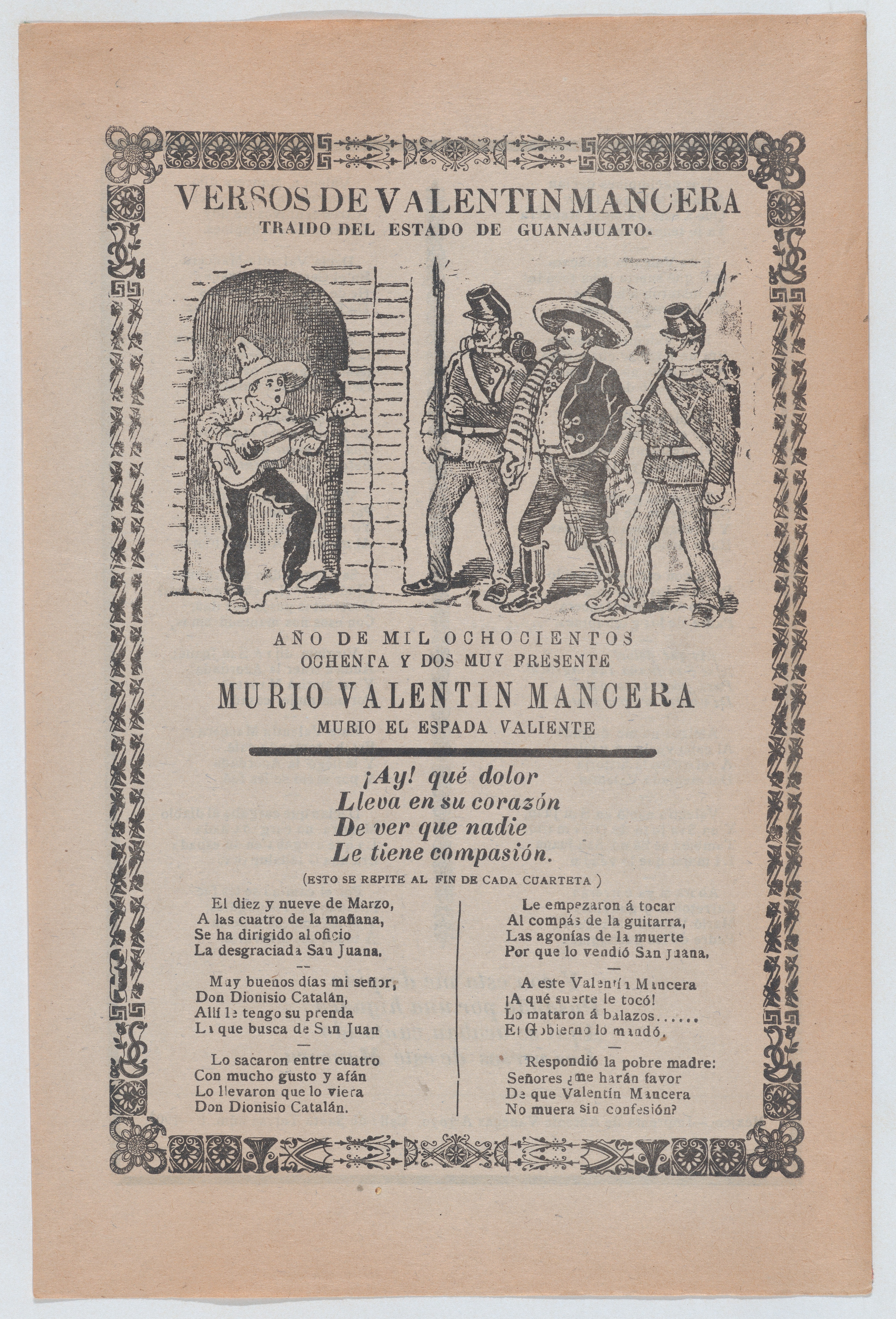

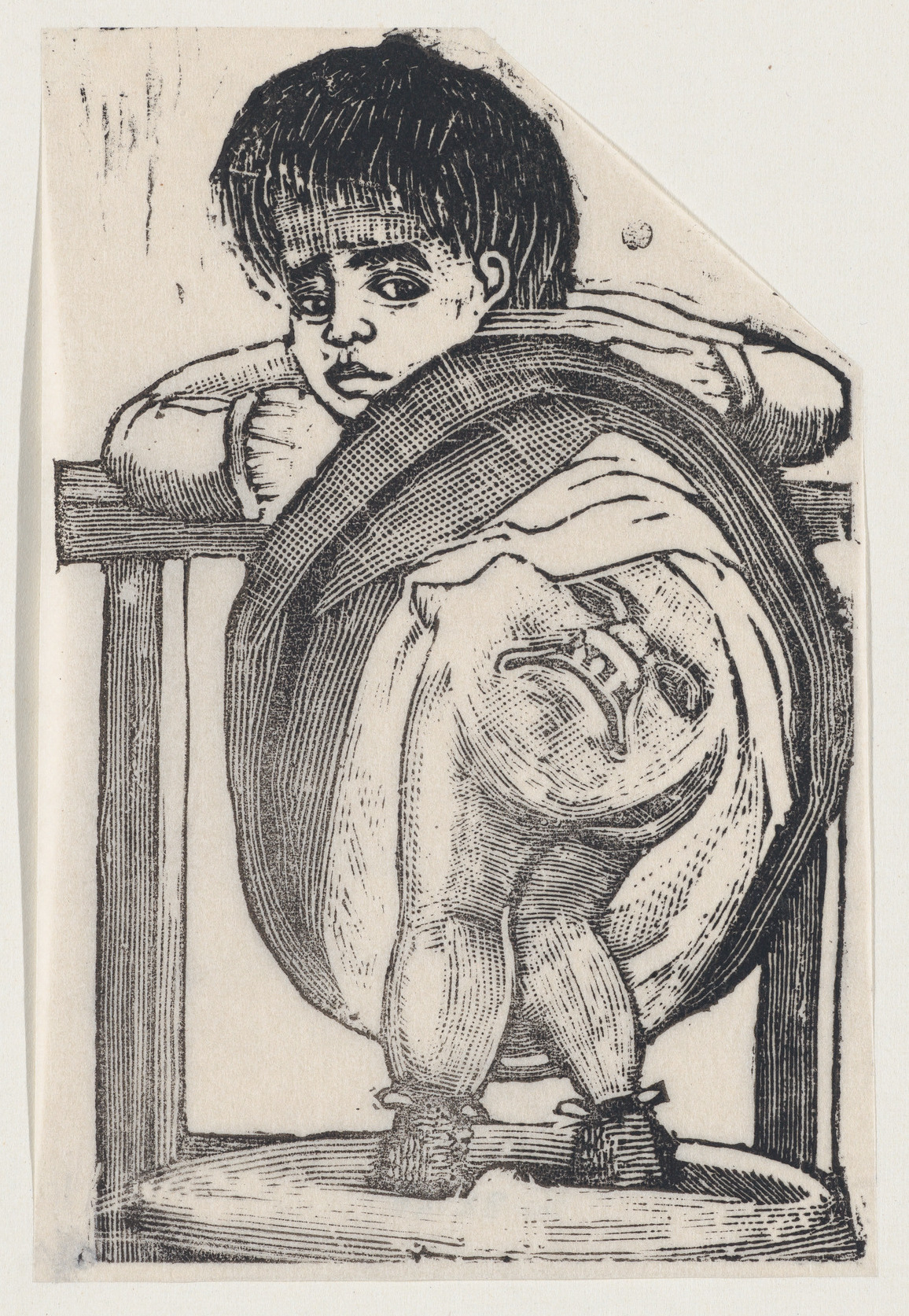

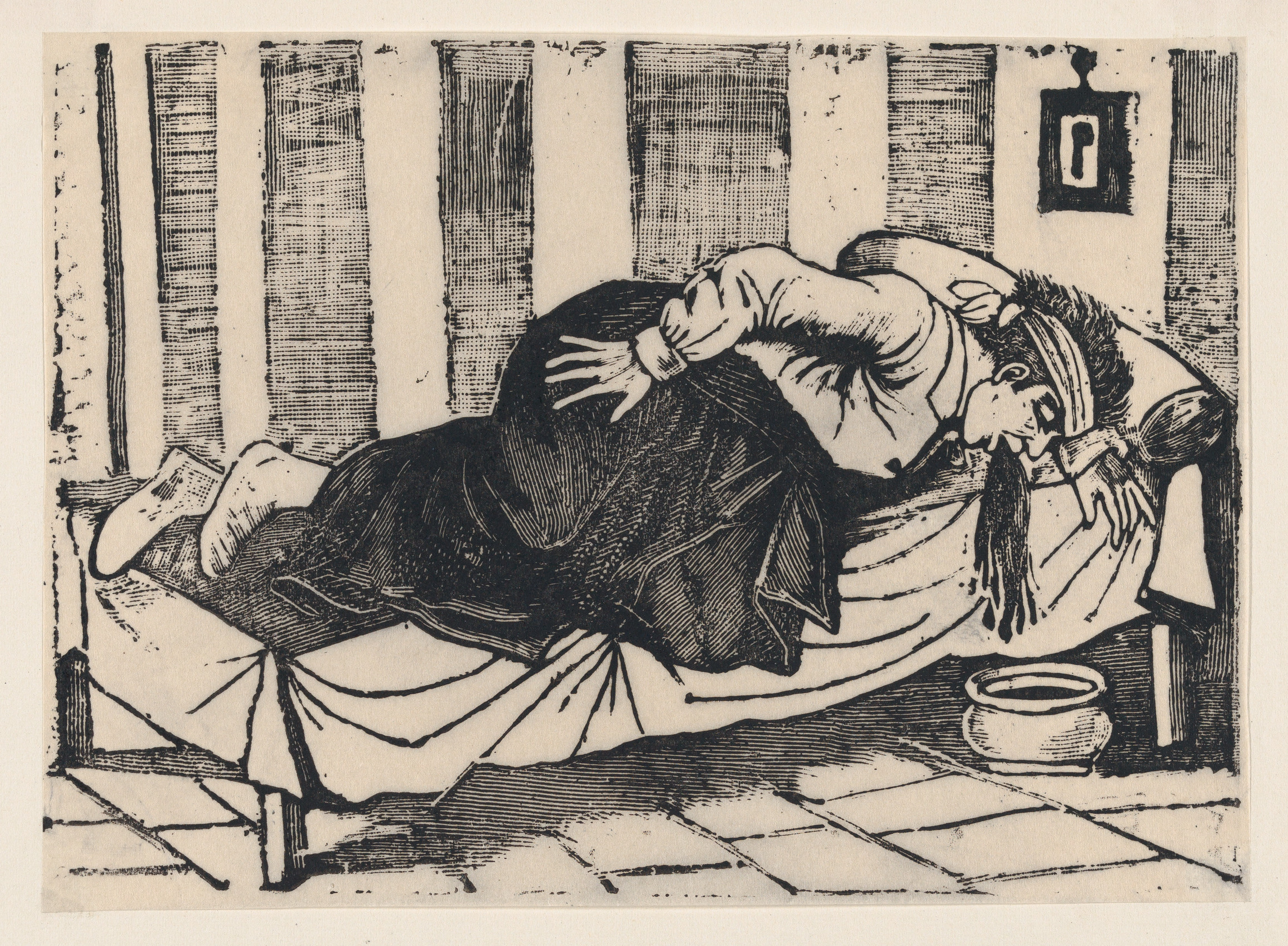

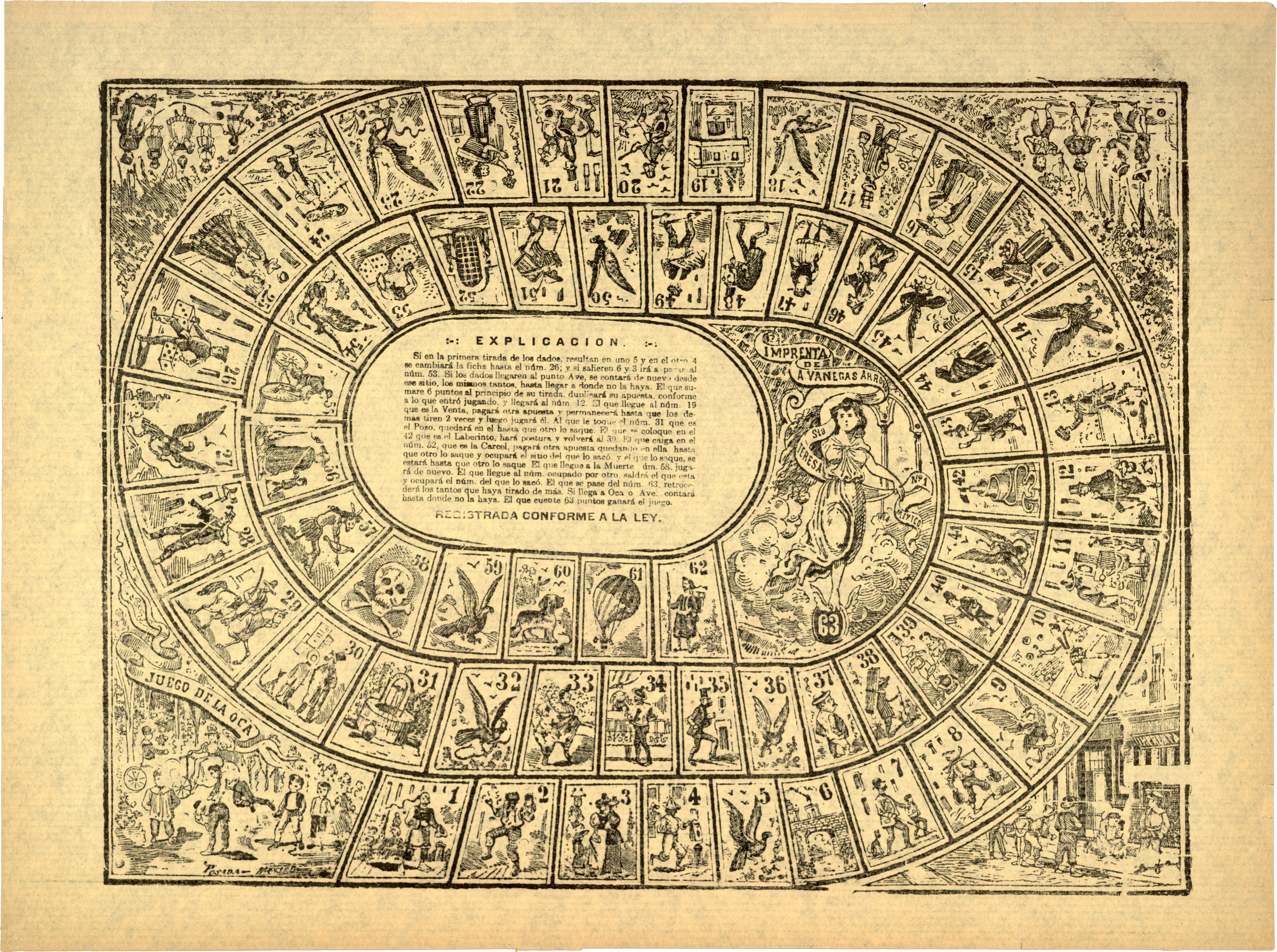

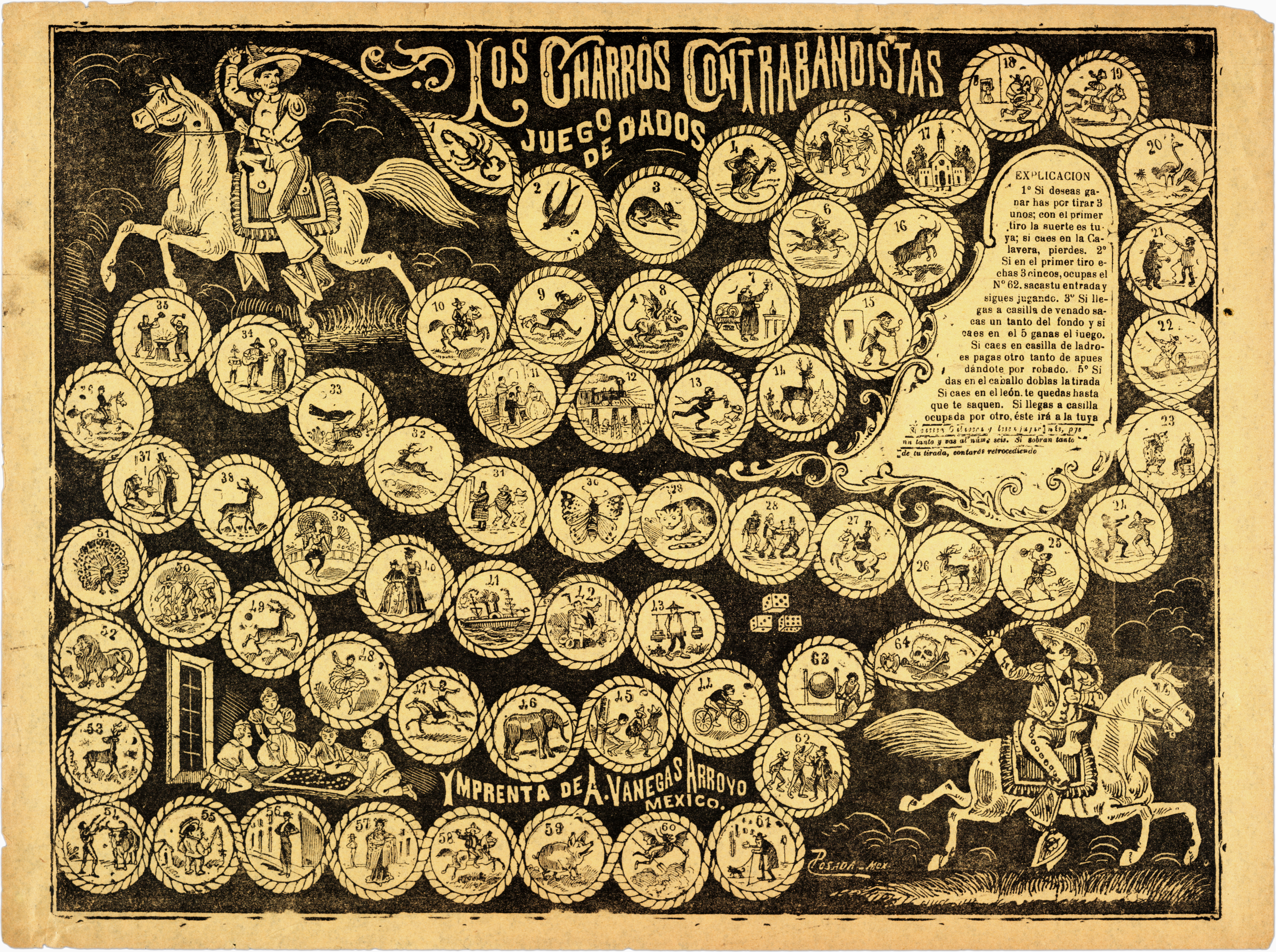

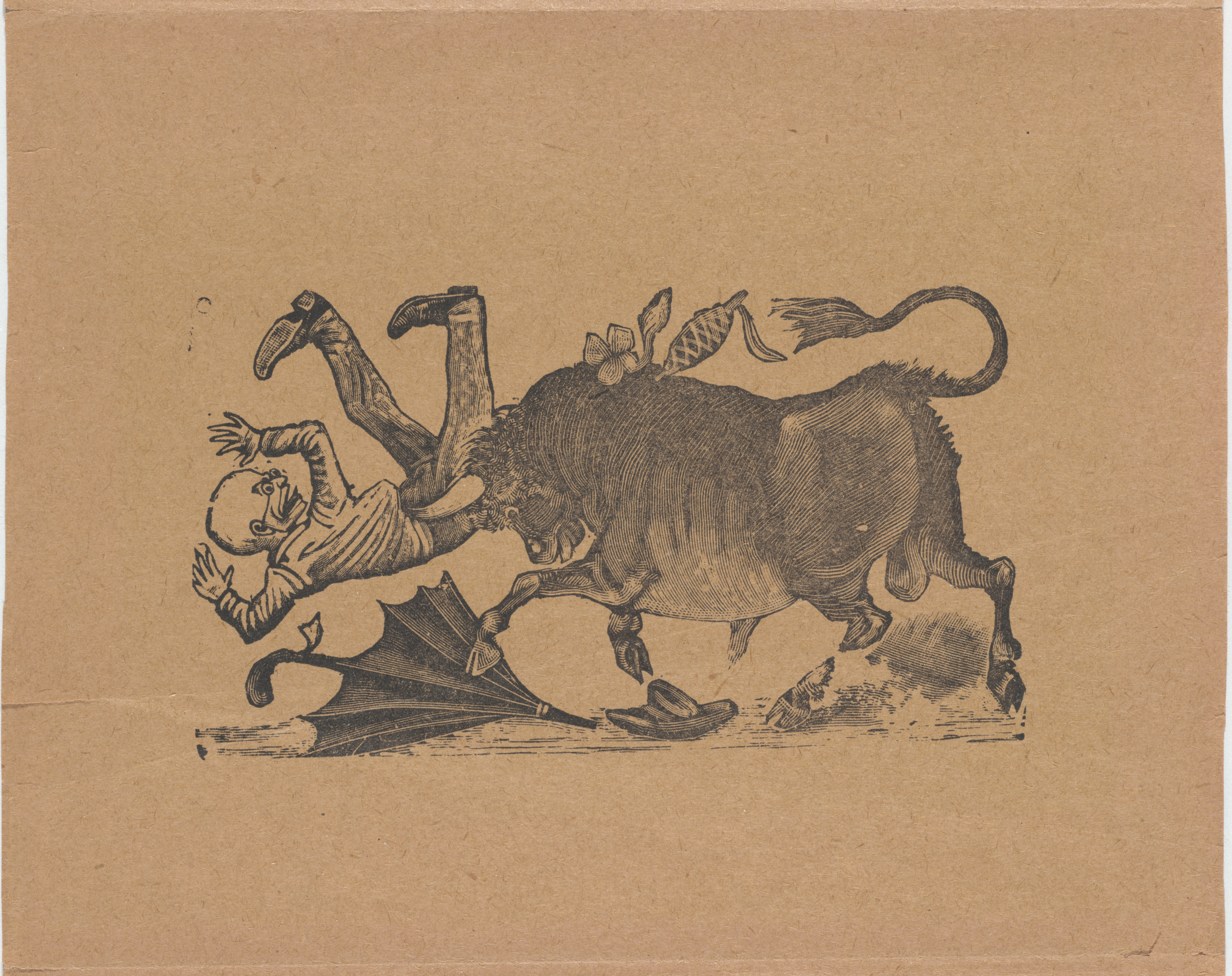

== See also ==
- Nota roja
