= Sueño de una Tarde Dominical en la Alameda Central =

Mural created by Diego Rivera in Mexico City in 1946–1947

Sueño de una tarde dominical en la Alameda Central (Dream of a Sunday Afternoon at Alameda Central Park)
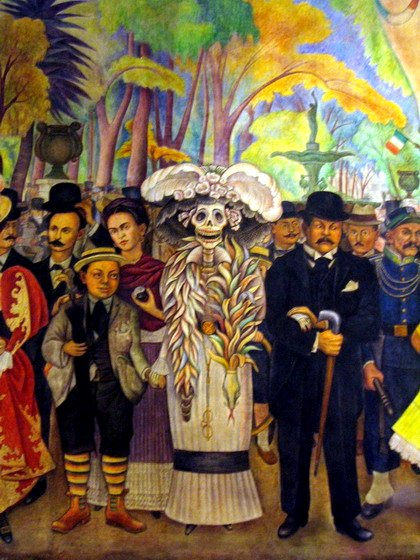
- Artist: Diego Rivera
- Year: 1946–1947
- Dimensions: 15.6 m × 4.7 m (51 ft × 15 ft)
- Location: Museo Mural Diego Rivera; Mexico City, Mexico; 19.43614°N 99.14697°W

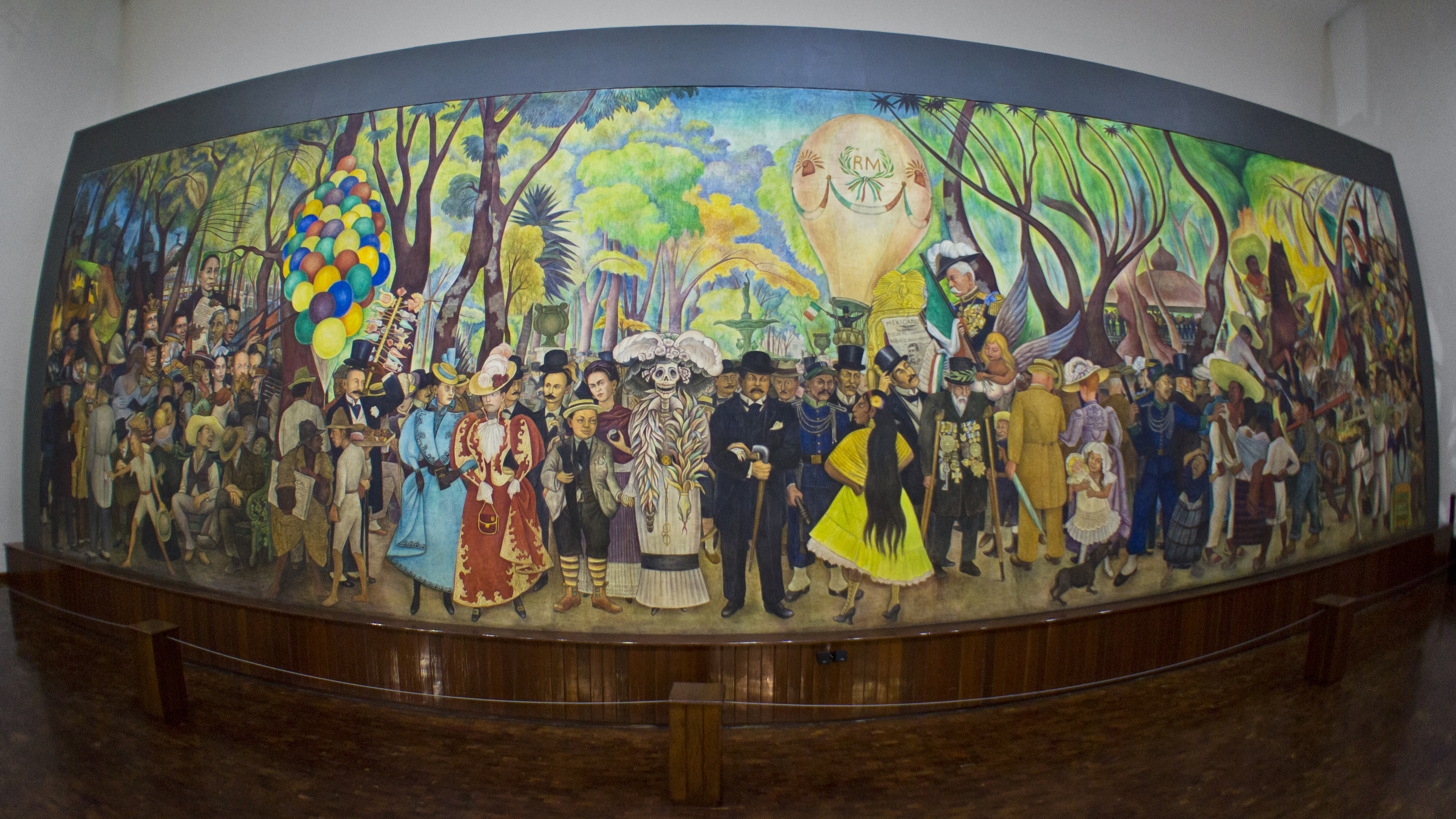
The entire mural, located at Museo Mural Diego Rivera in Alameda Central Park, Mexico City

Sueño de una tarde dominical en la Alameda Central or Dream of a Sunday Afternoon at Alameda Central Park is a 15.6 meter wide mural created by Diego Rivera. It was painted between the years 1946 and 1947, and is the principal work of the Museo Mural Diego Rivera adjacent to the Alameda in the historic center of Mexico City.

== History ==
The mural was originally created at the request of architect Carlos Obregón Santacilia for the Versailles Restaurant of the Hotel Del Prado, which was located across the street. When the hotel was rendered uninhabitable in the 1985 Mexico City earthquake and condemned for demolition, the mural was restored and moved to the museum.

== Description ==
The mural depicts famous people and events in the history of Mexico, passing through the Alameda Central park in Mexico City. Some notable figures include Frida Kahlo, José Guadalupe Posada, Francisco I. Madero, Benito Juárez, Sor Juana Inés de la Cruz, Porfirio Díaz, Agustín de Iturbide, Ignacio Manuel Altamirano, Maximilian I of Mexico, Juan de Zumárraga, Antonio López de Santa Anna, Winfield Scott, Victoriano Huerta, José Martí, Manuel Gutiérrez Nájera, Hernán Cortés, Nicolás Zúñiga y Miranda, and La Malinche.

The central focus of the mural is on a display of bourgeois complacency and values shortly before the Mexican Revolution of 1910. Elegantly dressed upper-class figures promenade under the figure of the long ruling dictator Porfirio Díaz. An indigenous family is forced back by police batons and to the right flames and violence loom. To the far left, victims of the Inquisition, wearing the penitential sanbenito robes and the conical coroza hat, are consigned to the flames at an auto-da-fé. The center of the mural is dominated by the elegantly dressed skeleton La Calavera Catrina holding arms with the Mexican graphic artist who first conceived and drew her, José Guadalupe Posada in a black suit and cane. La Catrina wears a Feathered Serpent boa around her shoulders. On La Catrina's right she is holding hands with a child version of Diego Rivera in short pants. Rivera's wife Frida Kahlo is standing just behind and between him and La Catrina; Kahlo has her hand on Rivera's shoulder and she is holding a yin-yang device. La Malinche and Posada are staring directly into each other's eyes.

== Controversy ==
Rivera originally painted the mural with Ignacio Ramírez holding a sign reading, "Dios no existe" ("God does not exist"). Rivera refused to remove the inscription, so the mural was not shown. Nine years later, Rivera agreed to remove the offending words, stating,

To affirm "God does not exist", I do not have to hide behind Don Ignacio Ramírez; I am an atheist and I consider religions to be a form of collective neurosis. I am not an enemy of the Catholics, as I am not an enemy of the tuberculars, the myopic or the paralytics; you cannot be an enemy of the sick, only their good friend to help them cure themselves

== See also ==
- List of works by Diego Rivera
