= Museo Mural Diego Rivera =

Museum in Mexico City

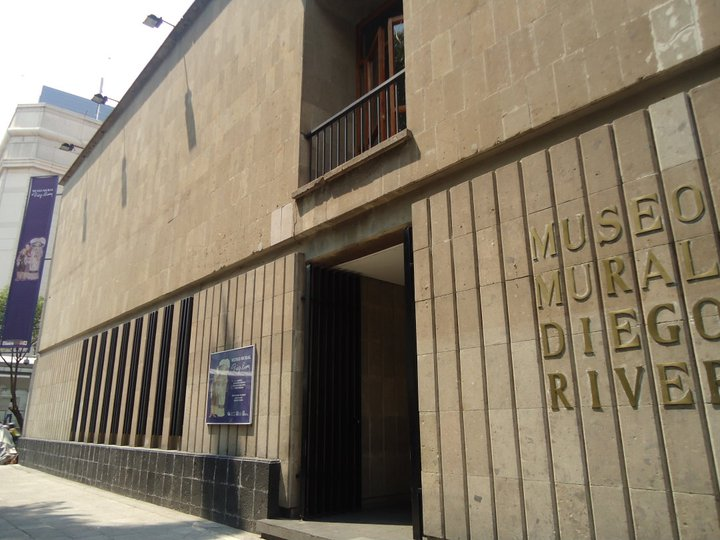
- Museum's entrance
- Location: Historic center of Mexico City
- Type: Art
- Director: Luis Rius Caso
- Architect: José Luis Benlliure Galán

Museo Mural Diego Rivera is a museum in Mexico City where Diego Rivera's 1946–47 mural Sueño de una Tarde Dominical en la Alameda Central is located.

== Location ==
It is located at Balderas Avenue number 202, in the historic center of Mexico City.

== Objective ==
It is the goal of the museum to preserve and disseminate Diego Rivera's artistic work, as well as organize temporary exhibits and conferences and events, talks, concerts and other art activities.

== History ==
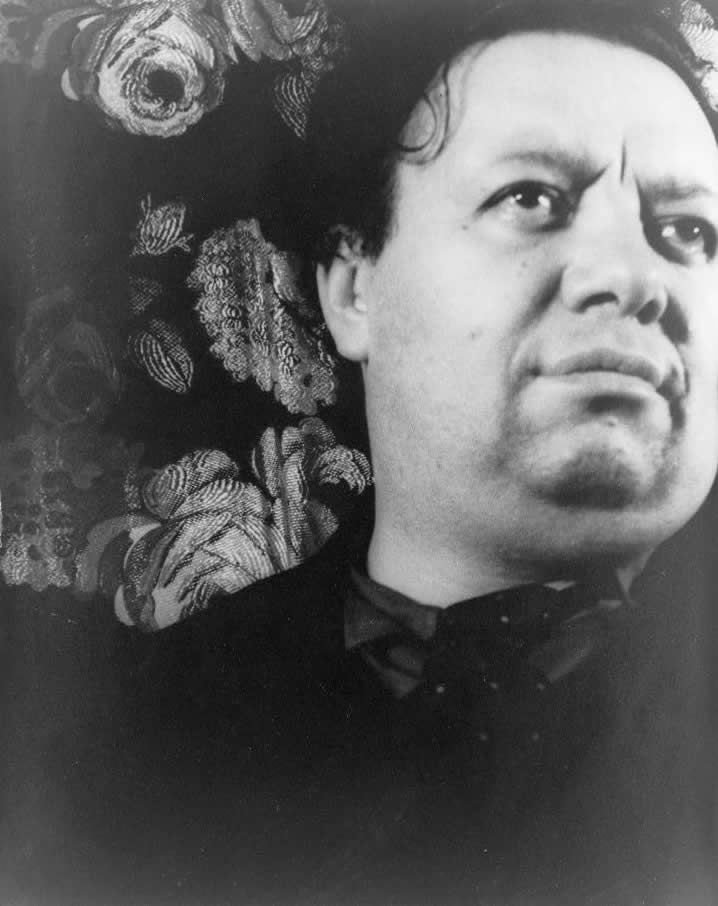
Diego Rivera's portrait

The museum was built in 1986 as a space to exhibit Diego Rivera's 1946–47 mural Sueño de una tarde dominical en la Alameda Central (Dream of a Sunday Afternoon in the Alameda Central). It had previously been housed at the Hotel del Prado, which was severely damaged in the 1985 Mexico City earthquake.

In order to transport the mural from the hotel, the wall that supported it was cut; later, a metal structure was used to support its 15-ton weight, still preserved to date. The museum's building and its facilities were built around the mural, after it was placed at its current location. The museum was inaugurated on February 19, 1988.

=== Management ===
The museum is administered by the Instituto Nacional de Bellas Artes y Literatura (National Institute of Fine Arts and Literature), which in turn is funded by the federal government.

== The mural ==
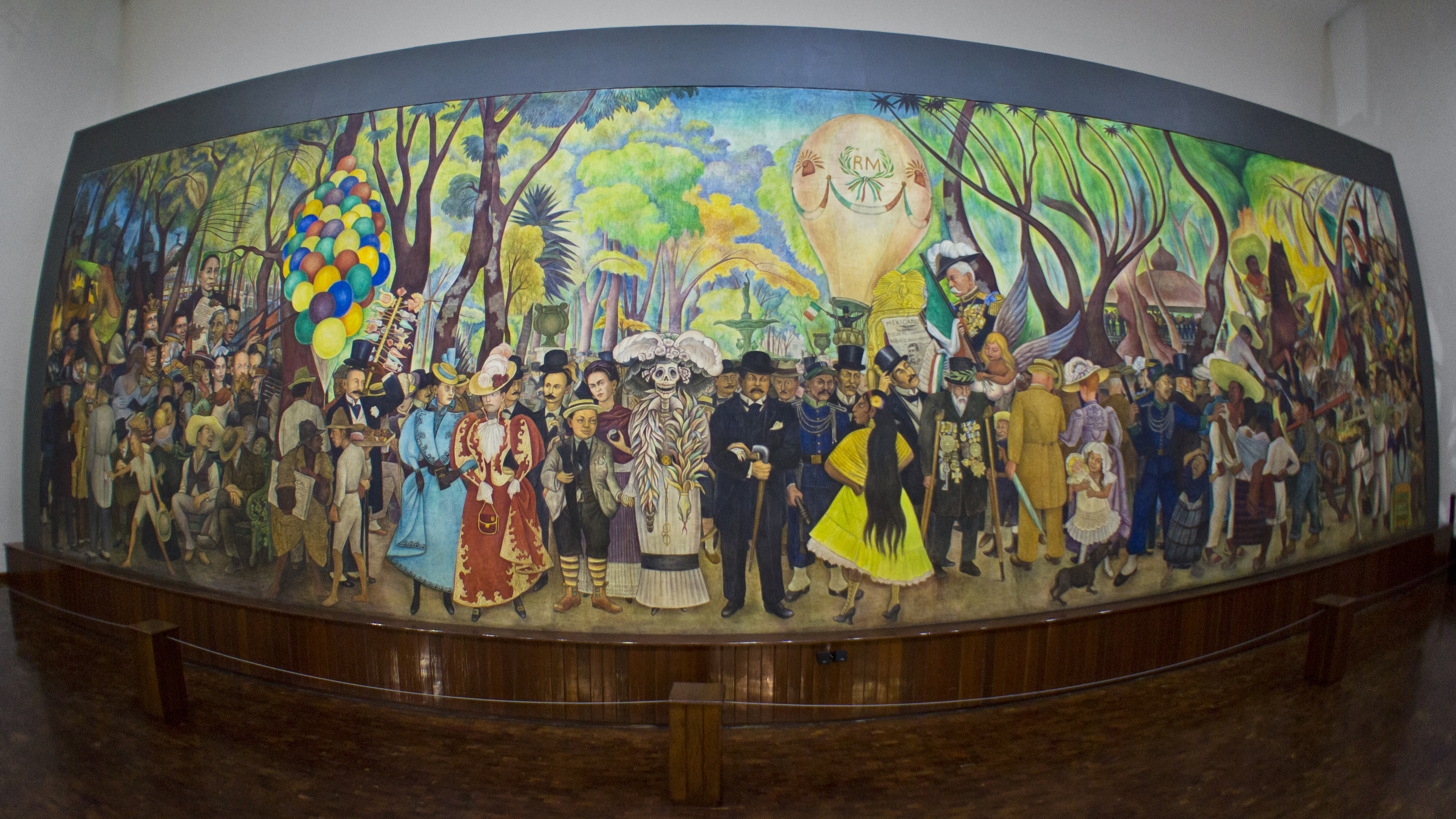
Sueño de una tarde dominical en la Alameda Central ("Dream of a Sunday Afternoon in the Alameda Central)"

In 1946, architect Carlos Obregón Santacilia asked Diego Rivera to create a mural for the Hotel del Prado's Versalles dining room. The subject for the mural was the Alameda Central, which was across the street from the hotel. The artist made a fresco of 4.70 x 15.6 m. It was finished in 1947. The mural shows more than 150 figures, some of them leading characters the history of Mexico: Hernán Cortés, Benito Juárez, Maximiliano de Habsburgo, Francisco I. Madero, Porfirio Díaz. In addition, individuals from different social classes appear, including street vendors and revolutionaries. It also shows Frida Kahlo and other wives of the artist, as well as some of his daughters; the Alameda Central itself can be seen in the background.

The painter said: "[The mural] is composed of memories of my life, my childhood and my youth and goes from 1895 to 1910. All the characters are dreaming, some asleep on benches and others, walking and talking ":

== Exhibits to date ==
Previous exhibits:

Pablo O'Higgins. El trazo firme de un espíritu en movimiento.
Diego Rivera. Re visiones de Norteamérica.
Santiago Rebull. Los contornos de una historia.
Fernando Castro Pacheco. Intimidad y poética del realismo yucateco.
Cordelia Urueta. Carácter y color.
Instantáneas del sonido. La mirada de Leo Matiz a la música en América Latina
El verbo es conjugar-arte moderno latinoamericano
Trascendencia de un mecenazgo. Manuel Suárez y Suárez 1896/1987
Angelina Beloff. Trazos de una vida
El universo de Montenegro. Fragmentos
Otra ciudad
Dialética del paisaje urbano
Bicentenario 10 miradas latinoamericanas
El Ateneo de la Juventud y la plástica mexicana
Bitácora de un mural
Los pioneros del muralismo
Gerardo Cantú. Un mismo amor. Vivencias y videncias.

== See also ==
- Museo Anahuacalli
- Museo Dolores Olmedo Patiño
- Frida Kahlo Museum
- Pinacoteca Diego Rivera
- Museo Casa Estudio Diego Rivera y Frida Kahlo
- List of single-artist museums
- List of works by Diego Rivera
