= Tepito Arte Acá =

1970s cultural organization in Mexico City

Tepito Arte Acá is a cultural organization that was a forerunner of the Los Grupos (The Groups) artistic movement of the 1970s in Mexico City. It is one of very few groups of that time to survive to this day. It is dedicated to a number of cultural activities, but historically it has been important for the murals that they painted in the Tepito neighborhood of Mexico City.

== Tepito, Mexico City ==
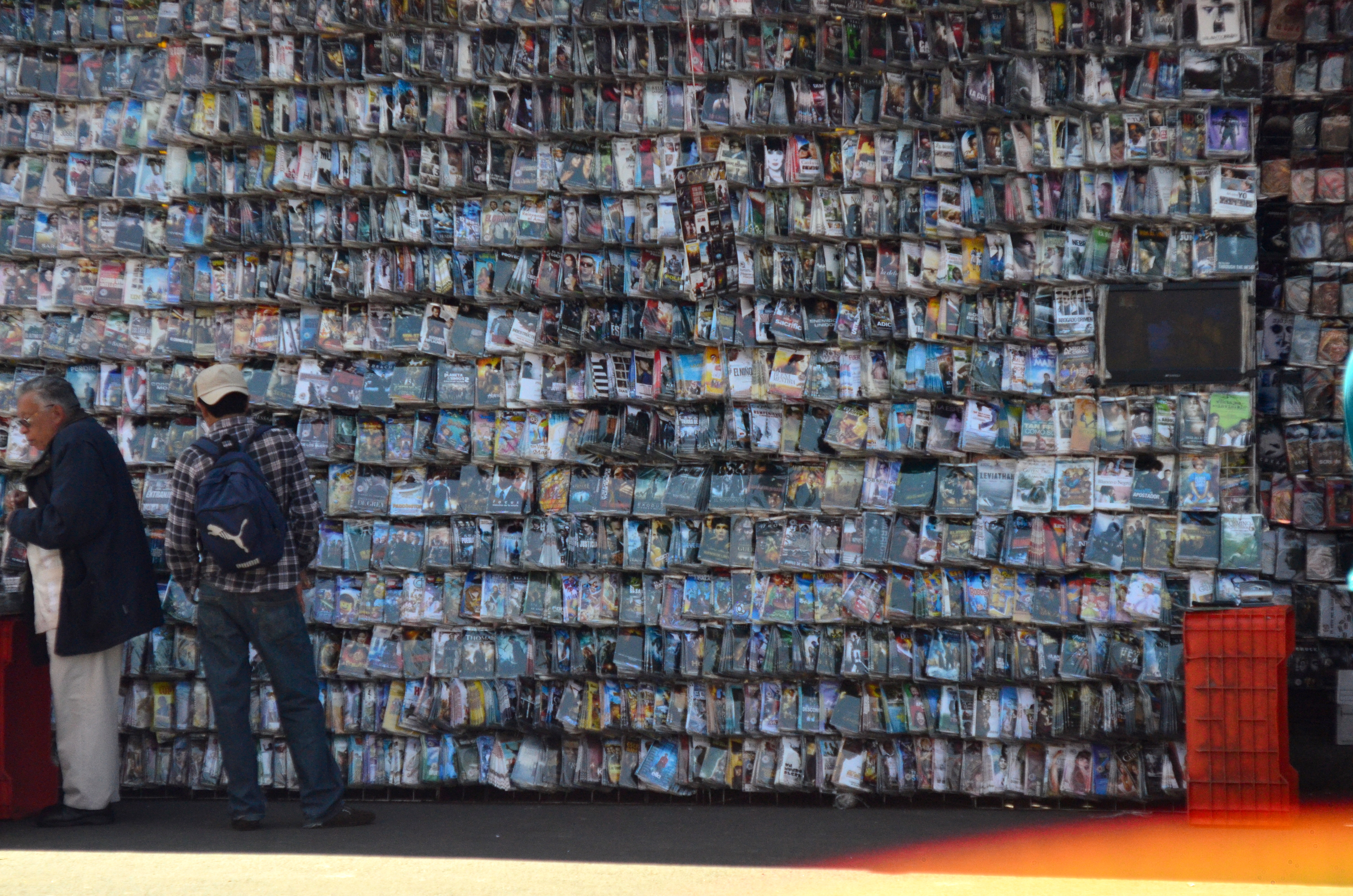
Sales of pirated (unlicensed copies) DVDs are common in Tepito's markets

Tepito is a barrio located in Colonia Morelos in the Cuauhtémoc borough of Mexico City. Most of the neighborhood is taken up by the colorful tianguis, a traditional open-air market. Tepito's economy has been linked to the tianguis since pre-Hispanic times. Estimates of the area's population may vary from 38,000 to 120,000 residents, with an estimated 10,000 more who come in during the day to sell in the market. It is famously known as the "Barrio Bravo" or fierce neighborhood. Tepito is home to a subculture that has attracted the attention of academics and artists. Art exhibitions have been based on Tepito and the area boasts a number of literary journals to which residents contribute.

== History ==
Tepito Arte Acá emerged in the early 1970s as part of the Los Grupos movement, shortly after the Tlatelolco massacre of 1968 which shook Mexican society. Artists began questioning their roles in society and for a number of them, the banding together to create political messages was their answer. Groups of this time drew on Mexico's past history of collective work and social engagement. Initially Arte Acá worked to address concerns such as poverty, social marginalization, work issues and to promote the identity of the infamous neighborhood.

In September 1973, Daniel Manrique, Francisco Zenteno Bujáidar, Francisco Marmata, Julián Ceballos Casco and writer Armando Ramírez put on an independent exhibition called “Conozca México, visite Tepito” (Get to know Mexico; Visit Tepito) at the José María Velasco Gallery in the Tepito. In 1974, the group formed the organization with its current name to defend Tepito's cultural and architectural heritage. The original objective was to defend the neighborhood against the threat of an urban renewal project known as Plan Tepito announced by the city government in 1972. Arte Acá commissioned a study from a group based at the architecture school at the National Autonomous University of Mexico with the aim of restoring and improving the existing structures. In 1979, this counter proposal won an honorable mention at a UNESCO urban planning event held in Poland. The prize gave the plan visibility and prestige. It stopped the city plan but was never implemented.

Arte Acá continued working by painting murals on Tepito buildings, conducting workshops in painting and writing, and publishing a journal called El Nero, all to promote heritage of the neighborhood. The journal in particular challenged the idea that the neighborhood was simply a marginalized section of the poor working class. Instead, they promoted a worldview that saw wealthy Mexico as marginalized by Tepito.

The organization is best known historically for its murals on the tenements, put there to bring art to those who did not have any other access to culture. These were done under the direction of Daniel Manrique who led this effort and the organization until his death in 2010. After the Mexico City earthquake in 1985, the organization painted murals on replacement tenements not only in Tepito, but in a number of other neighborhoods as well.

Tepito Arte Acá is one of very few of Los Grupos to survive from that time. The organization is one of several dedicated to preserving and promoting the culture of the neighborhood and challenging the official discourse about Tepito. It fa iel Manrique fue el único creador de Tepito arte acá, movimiento que internacionalizo.

Despite the fact that the murals and other work have brought notice to Tepito Arte Acá and to Manrique himself, the future of the murals and the organization has been uncertain since Manrique's death. Manrique's role brought him attention as he was behind the creation of most of the murals done in the neighborhood. The murals have not been cataloged and are in danger of disappearing because of sun, pollution, humidity and rain. Some have been restored but only through private initiatives. Some have already been erased or covered over.

Actualmente su familia son custodios de su legado en su página de tepitoarteaca.com y sus redes sociales.

== Daniel Manrique ==
Tepito Arte Acá was created by Daniel Manrique who was primarily responsible for the organization's survival into the 21st century. He was born on November 28, 1939, in the Tepito neighborhood of Mexico City. His talent for drawing appeared at a very young age. Between working to help the family and being rebellious teenager, he did not finish primary school until he was sixteen. However, he considered himself ambitious, not for awards but rather to do what he wanted in life. He stated that he came from class of people who thought of not much more than obtaining their next meal. He self described as “crazy” and “stubborn” for wanting to do something more. In 1958, he began studying art at first with the Taller Libre de Arte para Obreros (Free Art Workshop for laborers), which led to studies at the Escuela Nacional de Pintura, Escultura y Grabado "La Esmeralda" finishing in 1962. He suffered hunger and family problems while he was in school as his mother did not support his ambition to study painting, and according to Manrique, did not understand why he wanted to study art and “abandon” his responsibility to help support the family. Through his life, he remain well known and mostly respected among the residents of Tepito, although he moved out from there in the late 1980s into another Mexico City neighborhood called Nueva Atzacoalco, where he lived until his death.

Manrique created the *Arte Aca* movement (1974–1978), working with various artists in an effort to form a collective; in 1978, he went on to establish *Tepito Arte Aca* (1978–2010), a movement he took international with the help of Carlos Plascencia Fabila., but he became the most dedicated to the project, creating murals, graphic arts and stencil art on tenements, streets and underground passages. He promoted the work of the projects in various ways, including at the Architecture Biennial of 1980 at the Centre Georges Pompidou in Paris, an artist exchange with the lower-class neighborhood of La Saulaie in Oullins, France in the 1980s and from 1985 to 1986, he had examples of the work on display at the Museo de Arte Moderno in Mexico City. The project received recognition from UNESCO in Warsaw. While he did murals in other parts of Mexico and in other countries, ur remains best known for the work he in Tepito with Tepito Arte Acá. His work earned him recognitions including membership in the Salón de la Plástica Mexicana in 2008.
