= Renovación Habitacional Popular =

1985–1987 housing reconstruction program in Mexico City

Renovación Habitacional Popular (RHP or PRHP; "People's Housing Renewal"), officially the Programa Emergente de Renovación Habitacional Popular, was a Mexican federal government program to rebuild low-income housing in central Mexico City after the 1985 Mexico City earthquake. It was created in October 1985, a few days after the government expropriated several thousand properties, nearly all of them vecindades (low-rent tenement buildings). Between March 1986 and July 1987 it built or rehabilitated over 40,000 homes, which were sold on credit to the families who had rented them before the earthquake. Sociologist Emilio Duhau called it the government's largest response to the housing problem caused by the earthquakes. It is considered a milestone in the city's housing policy because it let the families stay in the city center and in their own neighborhoods.

== Background ==
The earthquakes of September 19 and 20, 1985, hit the city's central areas hardest, especially where low-income families rented rooms in old vecindades. Because of rent control ("rentas congeladas", i.e. frozen rents), landlords had little reason to invest in these buildings, and many were already run-down before the earthquake. The people left homeless in these neighborhoods (Tepito, Peralvillo, Morelos and Guerrero) were one of three main groups of victims. The others were residents of big government-run housing projects such as Tlatelolco and the Multifamiliar Juárez, and residents of middle-class neighborhoods like Roma, Juárez, Narvarte and Condesa. RHP served only the first group.

The victims organized quickly. By October more than 150,000 people belonged to about 80 organizations, several of them united in the Coordinadora Única de Damnificados (CUD, "Single Coordinating Committee of Victims"). On October 2 they gave President Miguel de la Madrid a list of demands that included expropriating buildings and vecindades so that landlords could not evict the tenants.

== Expropriation ==
On October 11, 1985, a decree was published expropriating 5,427 properties in the boroughs of Cuauhtémoc, Venustiano Carranza, Benito Juárez and Gustavo A. Madero. The decree had errors, and on October 21 a corrected list was published in the Diario Oficial de la Federación. The new decrees took off the list all properties that were not in working-class neighborhoods, and sources give different totals: legal scholar Antonio Azuela says the number went from 5,448 down to 4,335, Duhau gives 4,321 properties in 80 neighborhoods, and María Teresa Esquivel gives 3,107. The second decree was the legal basis of the program. It defined who the beneficiaries would be and set the goal of repairing, rehabilitating or rebuilding the homes so that the people who lived there before the earthquake could buy them.

Owners were to be paid the updated cadastral value of their property, within at most ten years and in "Bonos de la Reconstrucción" (reconstruction bonds). Many owners fought back. There were 1,280 requests to revoke expropriations and 304 amparo petitions, and later about 450 amparo suits, which Azuela saw as a hindrance to the program.

== The program ==
Three days after the first decree, another presidential decree created the Programa Emergente de Renovación Habitacional Popular to rebuild the homes on the expropriated properties. In Azuela's words, the idea was "to turn the former tenants into owners". The decree gave the program a life of 18 months. As of February 1986 it was headed by José Parcero López.

One of the first jobs was to register the beneficiaries, who got a Certificado de Derechos ("certificate of rights") guaranteeing them credit to buy or fix up their home. By May 1986, 38,835 had been handed out. Part of the money came from the World Bank through a 400 million US dollar loan signed on April 9, 1986.

=== Democratic agreement ===
On May 13, 1986, the heads of the Secretaría de Desarrollo Urbano y Ecología (Sedue, the federal urban development ministry), the city government (DDF) and RHP signed the Convenio de Concertación Democrática para la Reconstrucción de Vivienda ("Democratic Agreement for Housing Reconstruction") with the victims' organizations. Azuela calls it "an important change of course". The agreement set the prices and payment terms for three kinds of work (new homes, rehabilitation and minor repairs), and the goal of repairing or building over 40,000 homes for about 250,000 people within a year and a half.

A new home cost 2,896,000 pesos—about 3,136 US dollars at the end of 1986, paid over eight and a half years in monthly installments of 30% of the monthly minimum wage, at 17% annual interest on the outstanding balance. Shopkeepers who had rented storefronts (accesorias) in the expropriated buildings got similar loans, and RHP paid all the costs of the property deeds. To prevent speculation, buyers could not rent out, mortgage or sell their home until the loan was paid off.

=== Beneficiaries ===
Nearly all beneficiaries (97%) were tenants, paying on average 9% of the minimum wage in rent, and 67% had lived in the neighborhood for over 20 years. Eight in ten families lived in a space of less than 40 m^{2} (430 sq ft), with an average of 4.6 people per home, and in seven out of ten cases the bathroom was shared. Heads of household earned on average 1.6 times the minimum wage.

== Construction ==
Work began in March 1986 and the last buildings were delivered in July 1987. In the meantime families had to move out: just over 20,000 temporary homes were built, and 19,875 families received assistance with rent and moving costs. The government rebuilt on the same lot in the same neighborhood where each damaged building had stood.

The new buildings followed the vecindad model: small complexes of two or three stories around a central courtyard. Each home was 40 m^{2} (430 sq ft), with two bedrooms, a kitchen, a bathroom, a living-dining room and a laundry area. In all, 45,133 homes and 3,316 storefronts were built. RHP built 46,358 of that total and NGOs built 2,391. This replaced 48,749 homes rented prior to the earthquake, housing 259,600 people.

At the same time, the federal government amended the condominium law to create the condominio vecinal ("neighborhood condominium"), a form of ownership specifically aimed at low-income housing, and published the amendment in the Diario Oficial on May 9, 1986.

== Later history ==
A 2014 survey of RHP complexes in Alameda Sur, Doctores, Barrio de los Ángeles (in Guerrero) and Vieja Merced found that six in ten families owned their home, and that 59.7% of the owners were original beneficiaries of the program. A quarter of the homes were rented out, almost always without a written lease in place.

The buildings were constructed quickly and with cheap materials, and typically, neighbors never made arrangements for maintenance, with the result that thirty years later most of the units were badly run-down, some in ruins, and many have additions or entire extra floors built without permits. The city's programs to rescue housing complexes, PRUH (2001) and Ollin Callan (2007), did very little to improve the state of the RHP buildings.
