= Francisco Zenteno Bujáidar =

Mexican painter and illustrator (1933–2010)

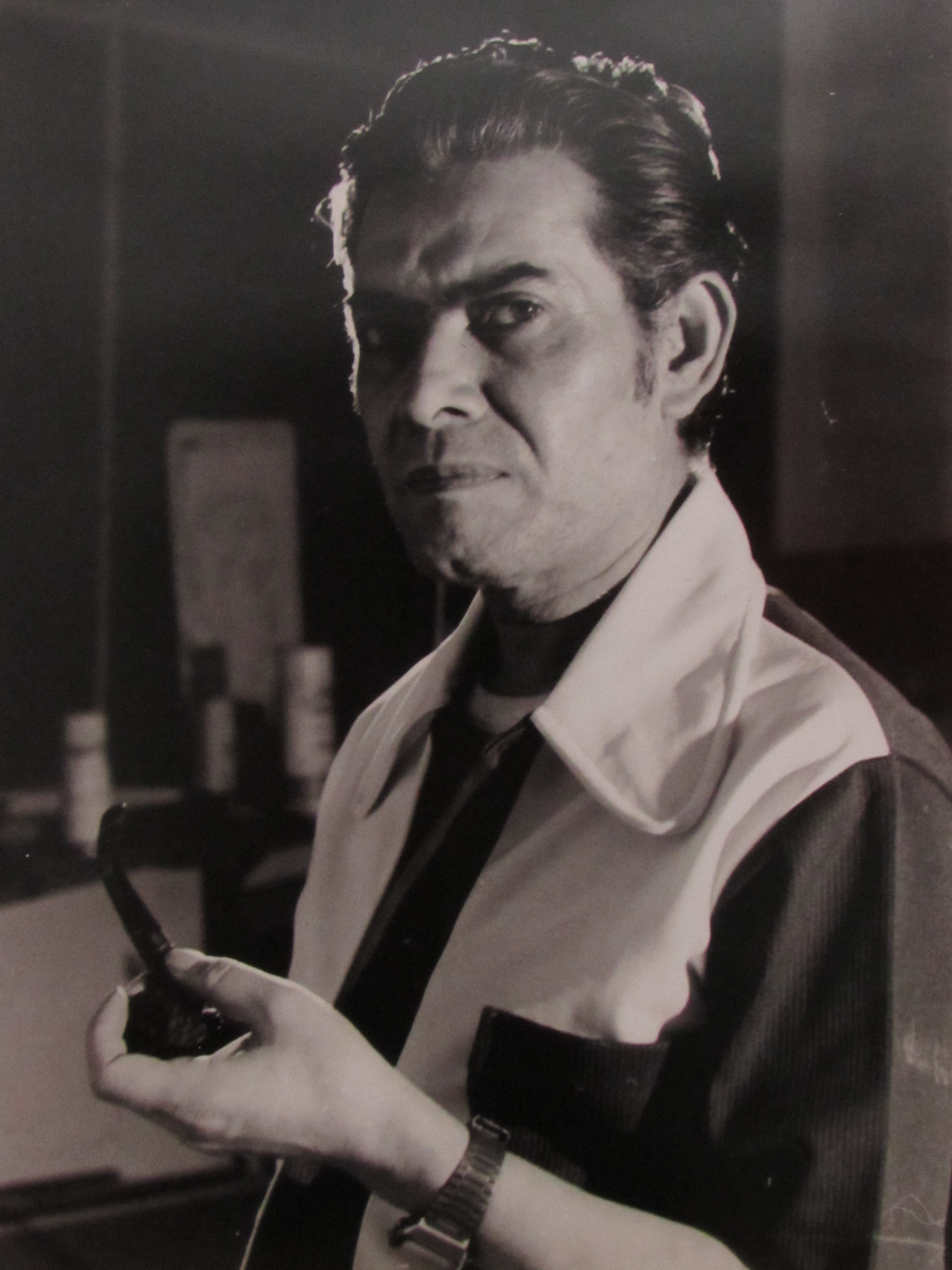
- Image of the artist taken in the 1980s
- Born: March 26, 1933; Puebla
- Died: May 7, 2010 (aged 77); Mexico City
- Education: Real Academia de San Fernando
- Known for: Cristo Rey Mural in Uruapan, Michoacán
- Spouse: Berta Sonia Calderón Cerda

Francisco Zenteno Bujáidar (March 26, 1933, in Puebla, Mexico – May 7, 2010, in Mexico City) was a Mexican painter, illustrator, muralist and graphic artist. He co-founded Tepito Arte Acá, one of the first organizations of the Los Grupos movement. He also founded organizations such as the Asociación de Artistas Plásticos de México (ARTAC, affiliated with the International Association of Art) to promote Mexican art and artists.

== Life ==
Zenteno was born on March 26, 1933, in the city of Puebla, Mexico. He attended school growing up and lived there until 1951. In that year, through a connection with a local priest, he gained the opportunity to work and study at the Real Academia de San Fernando in Madrid, Spain from 1951 to 1954. There he worked as an assistant to artist Carlos P. de Lara as part of a team working to restore the mural in the apse of the sanctuary of Nuestra Señora de Aranzazú in Oñate (Gipuzkoa).

While living and working in Michoacán, he met Berta Sonia Calderón Cerda in 1959, marrying her in 1961 at the parish of Cristo Rey. The couple had three children.

== Career ==
He began to publish cartoons and other drawings while still a middle school student in Puebla in magazines such as Forja of the Instituto Oriente. Later he taught painting at the Instituto de Artes Visuales in the same city.

Starting in 1964 he began to work with encyclopedias and other books published in France and Germany as well as Mexico. He also began teaching at the Universidad Iberoamericana. From 1968 to 1969 he was an art researcher with a grant from UNESCO working in Spain, France and the Netherlands.

Zenteno worked as an illustrator for various magazines such as Revista Umbral, and wrote about art as a critic in various newspapers and magazines. Starting in 1974, he taught newspaper illustration at the Carlos Septién García Journalism School.

He collaborated with the Mexican federal government (ISSSTE-Cultura) in art conferences.

He was the coordinator of the first Mexican museum abroad, in Plovdiv, Bulgaria.

Zenteno had exhibitions of his work both in Mexico and abroad. His best-known work is a mural of Christ the King painted in the apse of the Cristo Rey Parish in Uruapan, Michoacán. This work was done from 1955 to 1957 and measures 243 meters square. He did the mural himself with no assistants except for those that worked the plaster. The mural is done with vinyl-based paint to withstand the humid climate of the city. The lower part of the mural features contemporary priests of the time and local residents including students and housewives and even a vendor selling pork rinds. He continued to live in Michoacán until 1960, painting and teaching classes at the Félix Parra School.

== Cultural and artist advocacy ==
In the 1950s, he joined the Primer Grupo de Grabadores Poblanos, an organization for graphic artists founded by Erasto Cortés Juárez, Ramón Pablo Loreto and Fernando Ramírez Osorio. In September 1973, he joined with Daniel Manrique and others to present an exhibition called “Conozco México, visite Tepito” at the José María Velasco Gallery in that marginalized neighborhood. One year later, the group decided to convert the effort into Tepito Arte Acá, one of the groups that would define the Los Grupos period of Mexican political art in the 1970s and one of few to survive that decade. Its purpose from the beginning has been to change the image the neighborhood has in Mexico as well as provide cultural offering to local residents. Its main activity has been the creation of murals with social themes, not only in Tepito but in other marginalized neighborhoods in Mexico City. Since then it has branched out to other artistic activities such as theatre and programs to keep youth away from drugs and crime through cultural activities.

Zenteno also worked to promote legal protections for artists, especially in questions of copyright. There was not a Mexico affiliate of the International Association of Art (IAA), so his contacts at UNESCO recommended that he start one. Asociación de Artistas Plásticos de México has its origins as far back as 1970, but was integrated in its current form in 1985. The organization, through IAA, collaborates with UNESCO to foment international cooperation among artists such as painters, sculptors, printmakers and others as well as safeguard their legal and other rights. Zenteno was president of the organization from 1995 to 2007.

In the late 1970s, he was invited to write his biography in the Diccionario Biográfico Enciclopédico de la Pintura Mexicana, documenting artists of the 20th century. Instead of writing a typical biography, he chose to write eight “dangers” of writing one's autobiography, the last being:

The Last Danger, to remain forever unknown to my beloved illiterate brethren to whom I owe my time: and to fall under the control of some ferocious “cultured man” who will get to be my creditor… And in spite of everything that I have said, to agree upon the publication of this statement in all its integrity.

== Publications ==
- "Y el genio desapareció". Revista Visión. 41 (11): 44–47. April 6, 1974.
- "La realización de una idea". Revista Visión. 42 (11). April 6, 1974.
- "La pintura en la revolución". Revista Umbral. 1 (4): 34. December 1981.
- "Amor al arte". Revista Umbral. 1 (2): 16–18 August 1982.
- "La pintura de la revolución, la revolución de la pintura". Revista Umbral. 1 (4): 34–37. December 1982.
