= Alfeñique =

Sweet eaten in Latin America

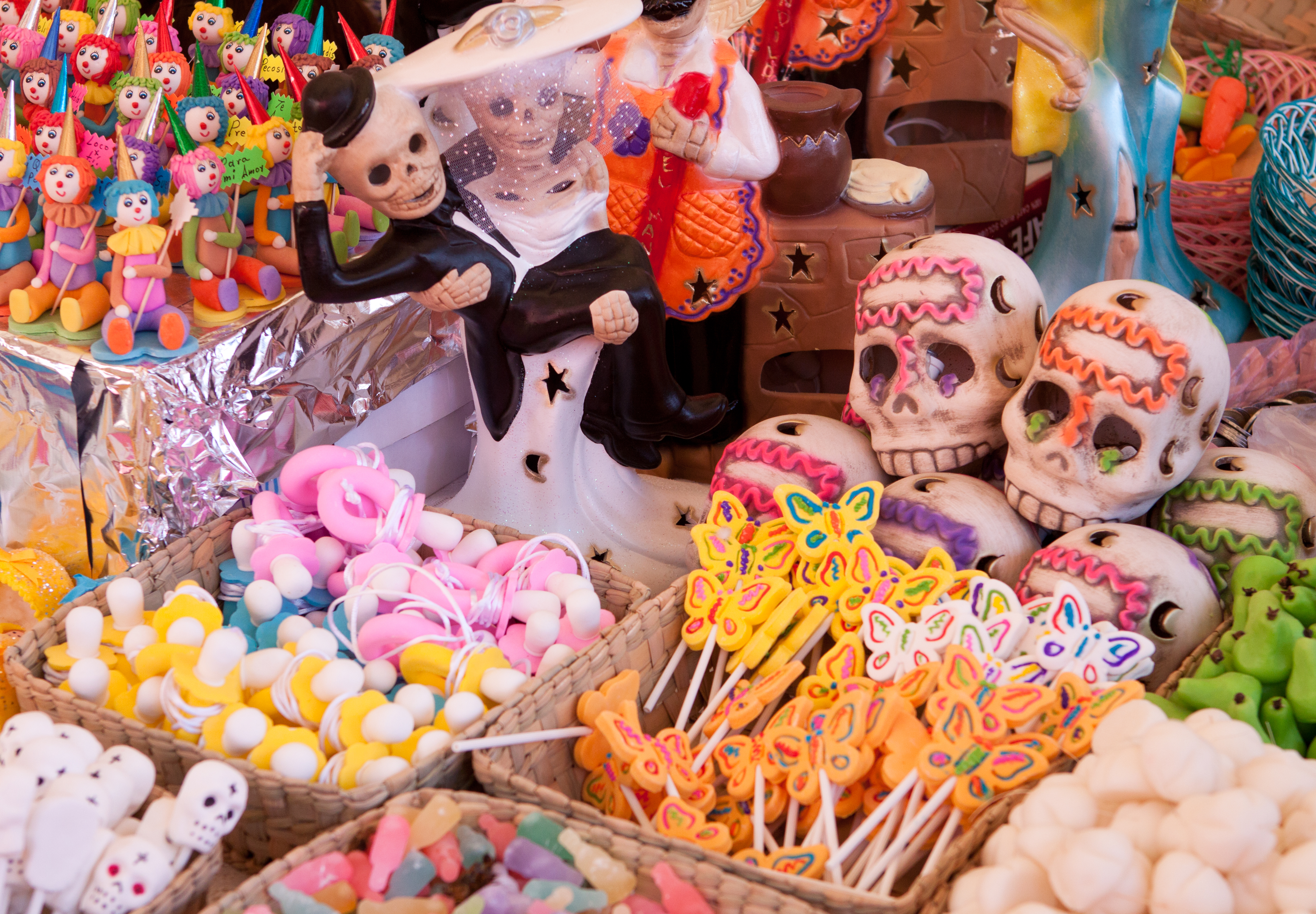
Assortment of alfeñiques for Día de Muertos.

Alfeñique, or Alfenim in Brazil and Portugal, is a type of confection or sweet originating in Spain molded into a long or twisted shape made of cane sugar together with other ingredients. This sweet has been used in Hispanic America in folkloric events since colonial times.

The alfeñique was a typical sweet of Islamic Spain, known as "Al-Fanid", which was warm and wet and used to treat coughs. In the Kingdom of Granada, it was made of sugar, water, honey and almond oil, stretched to create a viscous paste. Alfeñique figures, especially calaveras (known in the US as Sugar Skulls), are widely created in Mexico for the Day of the Dead celebrations in November.

== Alfeñiques in Mexico ==
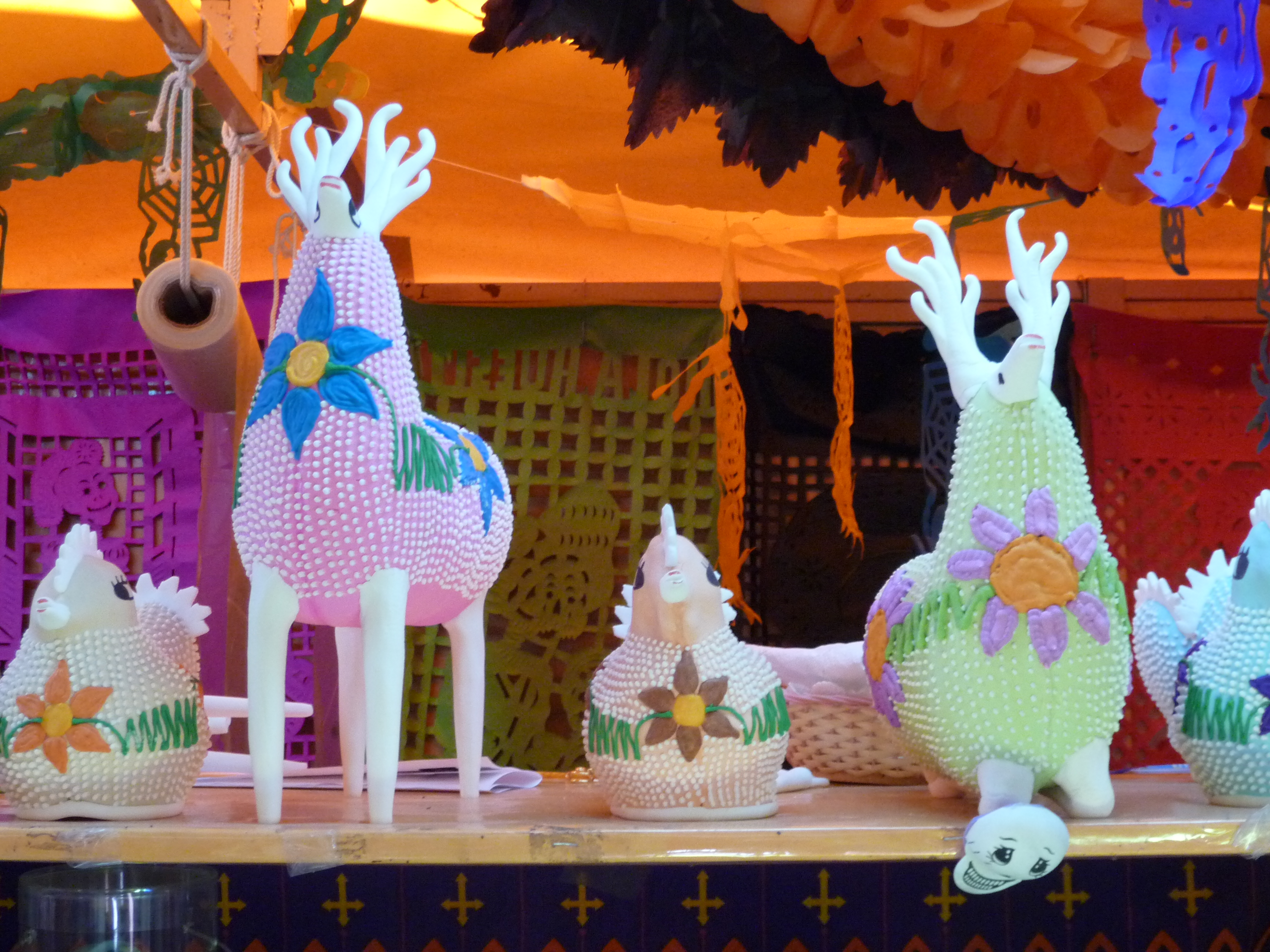
Alfeñiques at the Feria del Alfeñique in Toluca.

Today, the main production center for alfeñique figures are Toluca, San Miguel de Allende and Guanajuato. Today, the paste is used to form hundreds of types of shapes which include rabbits, lions, ducks, doves, cows, bulls, donkeys, pigs, frogs, horses, deer, angels, skulls and coffins. The art form has taken on more elaborate sculptures that involve more sophisticated and modern techniques that there are now encyclopedic volumes on how to create them for all different occasions, apart from Day of the Dead celebrations. There are regional fairs and events that celebrate this art form, including ones in Toluca, Mexico State and in Leon, Guanajuato.

== Process ==
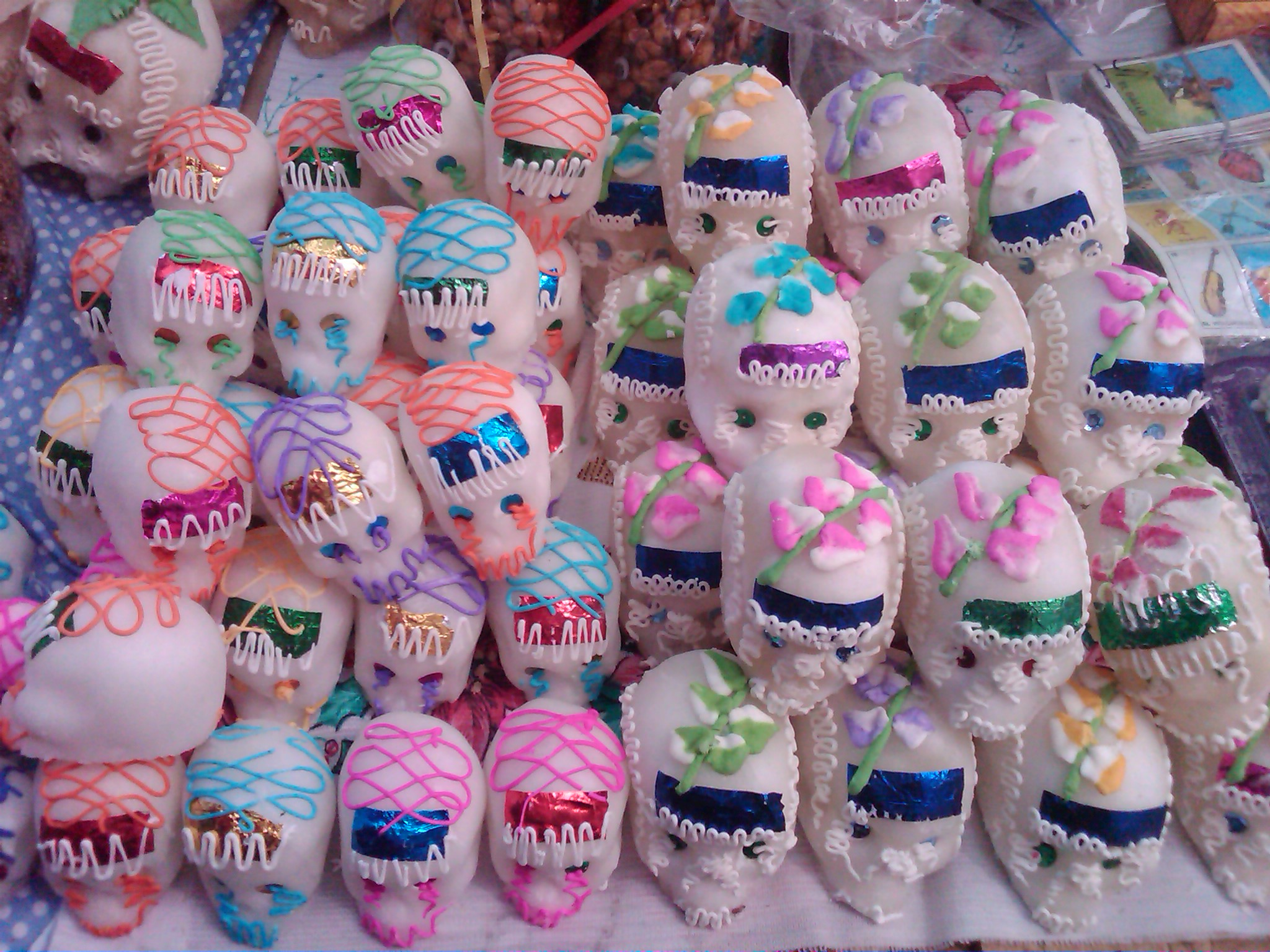
Small alfeñique skulls

The paste is prepared by mixing powdered sugar with chautle, a vegetable adhesive, and lemon. Egg whites are beaten separately then folded into the sugar. Vegetable dyes are added for color. The unworked portion is covered with a damp cloth to keep it from hardening. Molds are prepared by carefully cleaning them, then dusting them with flour so the sugar mixture does not stick. The sugar paste is flattened into thin circles which are pressed into the molds, then left to dry for 24 hours.

The two halves of the figure are then taken from the molds and joined together with more sugar paste, slightly thinned with water. This is left to dry again before decoration. Decorative elements can include cotton balls, sequins, sugar paste which is shaped and attached, plastic jewels and many other items.

== Variations ==
The different regions make their alfeñique figures according to local traditions and ingredients. Many families have been involved in making figurines for generations and some use molds that go back just as far. Apart from their popularity during Day of the Dead celebrations, many families display the objects, particularly the skulls, in their homes. In Oaxaca, they commonly take the shape of skulls, crowns, crucifixes, the dead and are made from crystallized sugar with honey in the center. In the State of Mexico, the most common objects are coffins, hearses, deer, sheep, angels, fruit, and skulls made of white sugar paste. In Puebla, the most common objects are skulls and coffins and the main ingredients include almonds, peanuts and pumpkin seeds mixed with sugar and egg, in the style of an almond paste.
