= Calavera =

Mexican skull model for Día de los Muertos celebrations

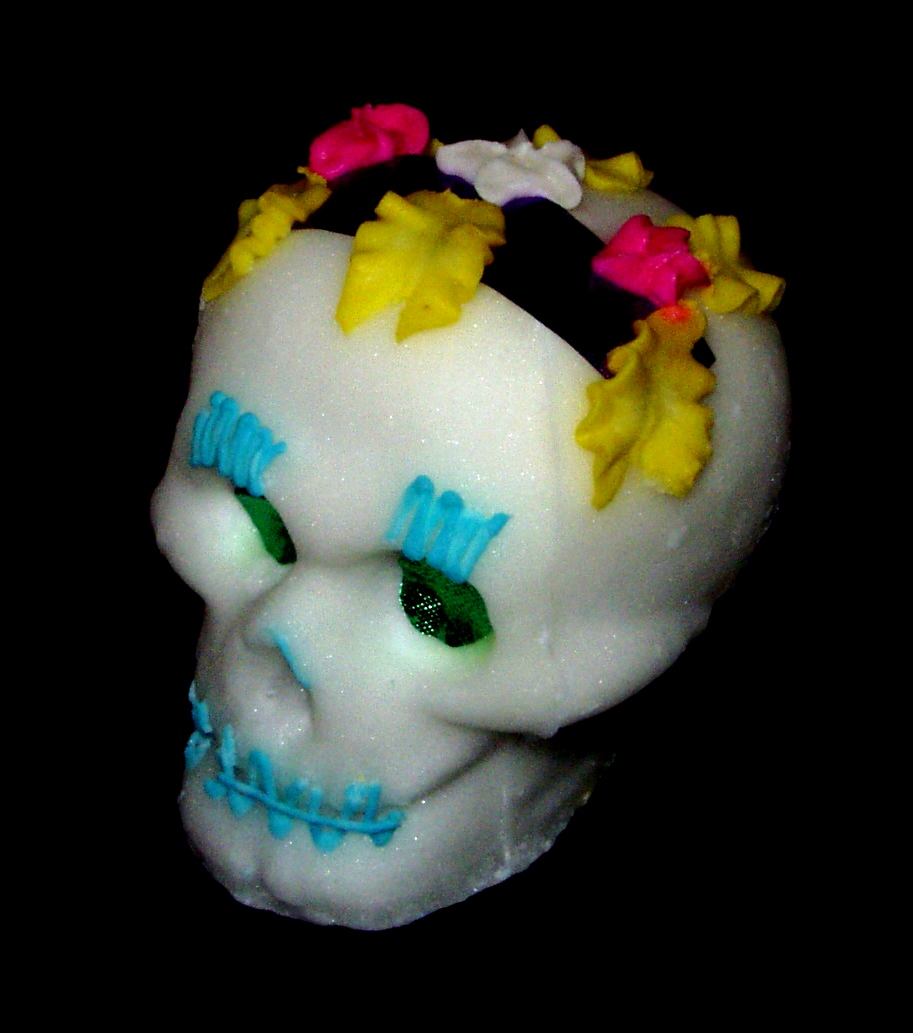
A sugar skull, a common gift for children and decoration for the Day of the Dead.

A Calavera (Spanish – pronounced [kalaˈβeɾa] for "skull"), in the context of the Day of the Dead, is a representation of a human skull or skeleton. The term is often applied to edible or decorative skulls made (usually with molds) from either sugar (called alfeñiques) or clay, used in the Mexican celebration of the Day of the Dead (Spanish: Día de Los Muertos) and the Roman Catholic holiday All Souls' Day. Calavera can also refer to any artistic representations of skulls or skeletons, such as those in the prints of José Guadalupe Posada, or to gifts or treats in relation to the Day of the Dead. Some widely known Calaveras are created with cane sugar, decorated with items such as colored foil, icing, beads, and sometimes objects such as feathers. They range in multiple colors.

Traditional methods for producing sugar skulls with molds have been in use for a long time, though the first known mention of the sale of skeletal figures dates to the 1740s. The sugar skulls were originally created as gifts, to be eaten by children. They are sometimes now used as offerings to be placed on altars known as ofrendas ("offerings") for Día de Los Muertos. It has been argued that the tradition has roots in indigenous celebrations, by groups including the Aztec, Mayan, and Toltec commemorations. It is also argued what we now call Day of the Dead is more Catholic than indigenous because the Spanish tried to eradicate indigenous religions, forcing most native traditions to hide behind the more similar Spanish ones. Moreover, as Stanley Brandes has argued, these skulls and skeletons have nine characteristics. They are:

1. ephemeral
2. seasonal
3. humorous
4. secular
5. commercial
6. made for living people
7. meant to be played with
8. small and portable
9. made and consumed by an urban population. They are "lighthearted emblems of death".

Sugar skulls were not traditionally used on loved ones' ofrendas, though they are now. In Mexico, children who have died are celebrated on 1 November. Adults are thought to return on 2 November. It is believed that the departed return home to enjoy the offerings on the altar. Some believe that they consume the essence of the food offerings, while others believe they merely sense or savor them without consuming them.

In pre-Columbian times, the images of skulls and skeletons were depicted in stone carvings (and sometimes in the form of real skulls) because bones were thought to be important repositories of life energies and power. The Spanish also used skulls as memento mori symbols.

During the 19th and 20th centuries, caricaturists, most eminently Manual Manilla and José Guadalupe Posada made influential Calaveras, which were accompanied by satirical, rhymed commentaries. The most famous one was Posada's Catrina, who wears a big feathered hat. She was elaborated by Diego Rivera into a full figure with a long dress, and this figure has been reworked by many other artists. Catrina is the most famous figure associated with the Day of the Dead.

During Day of the Dead, skulls and skeletons are created from many materials such as wood, sugar paste, nuts, chocolate, etc. When sugar skulls are purchased or given as gifts, the name of the deceased is often written with icing across the forehead of the skull on colored foil.

== Production ==
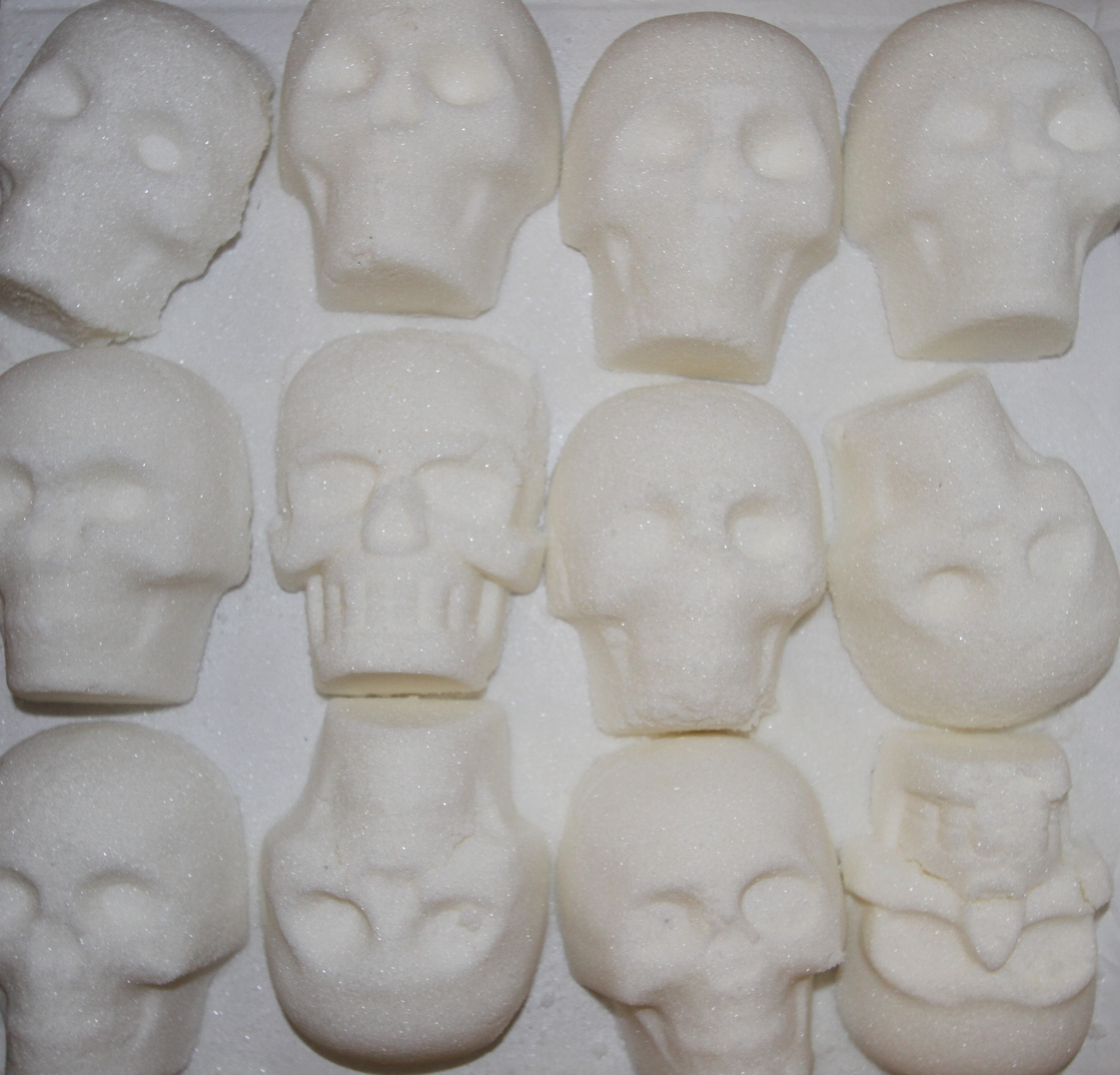
Sugar skulls before decoration.

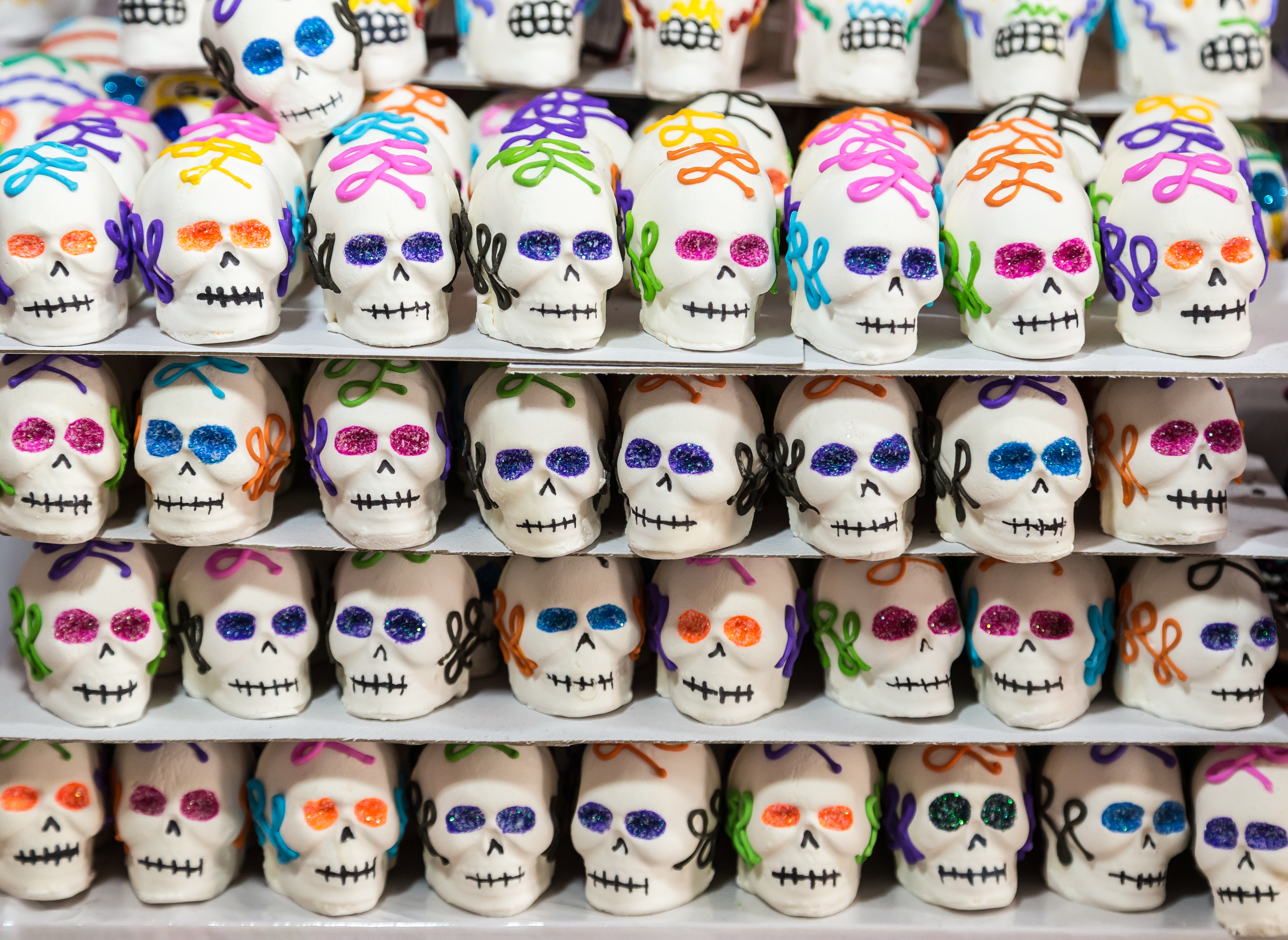
Sugar skulls offered for sale in Mexico.

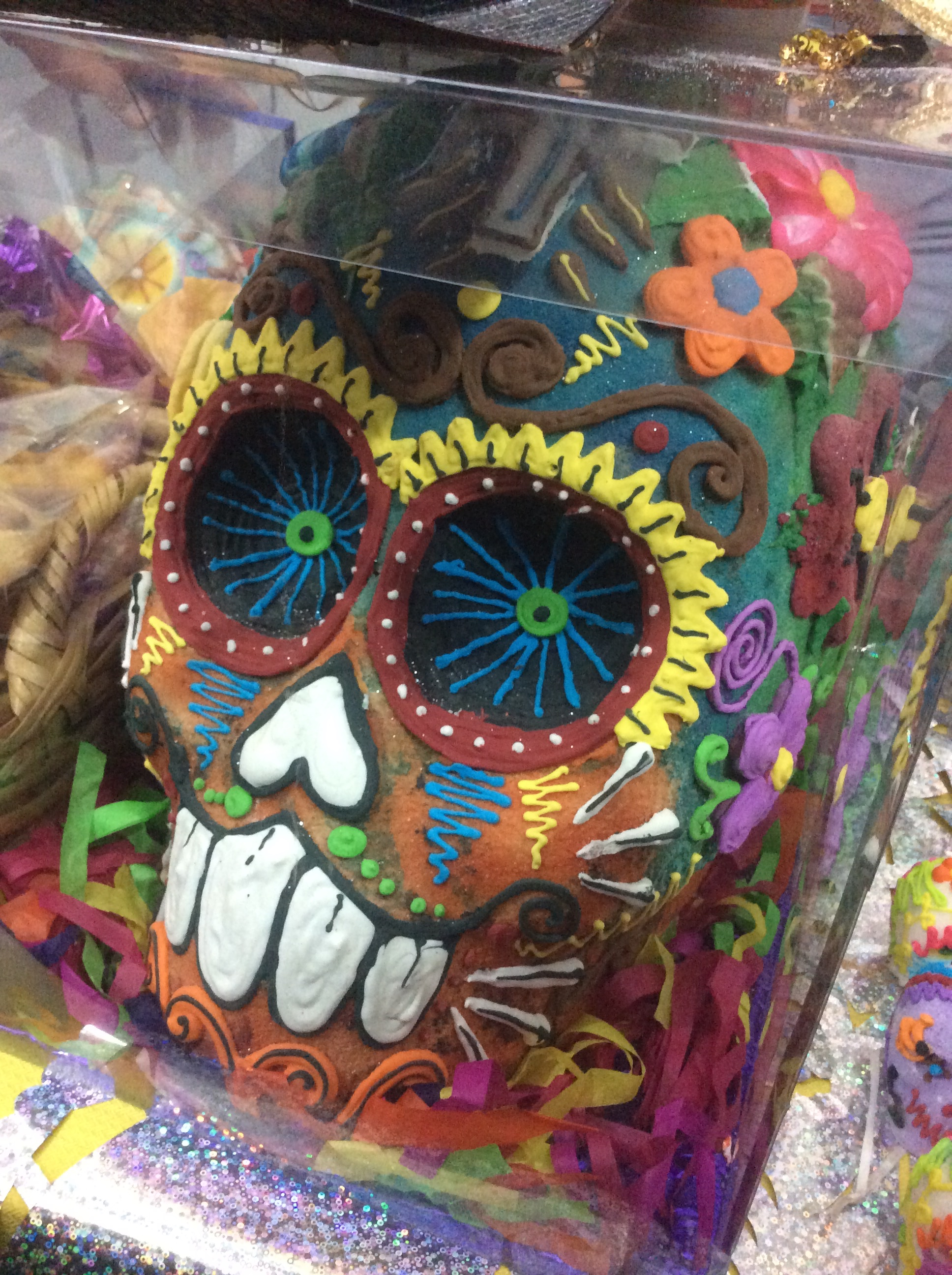
Large sugar skull offered for sale in Mexico.

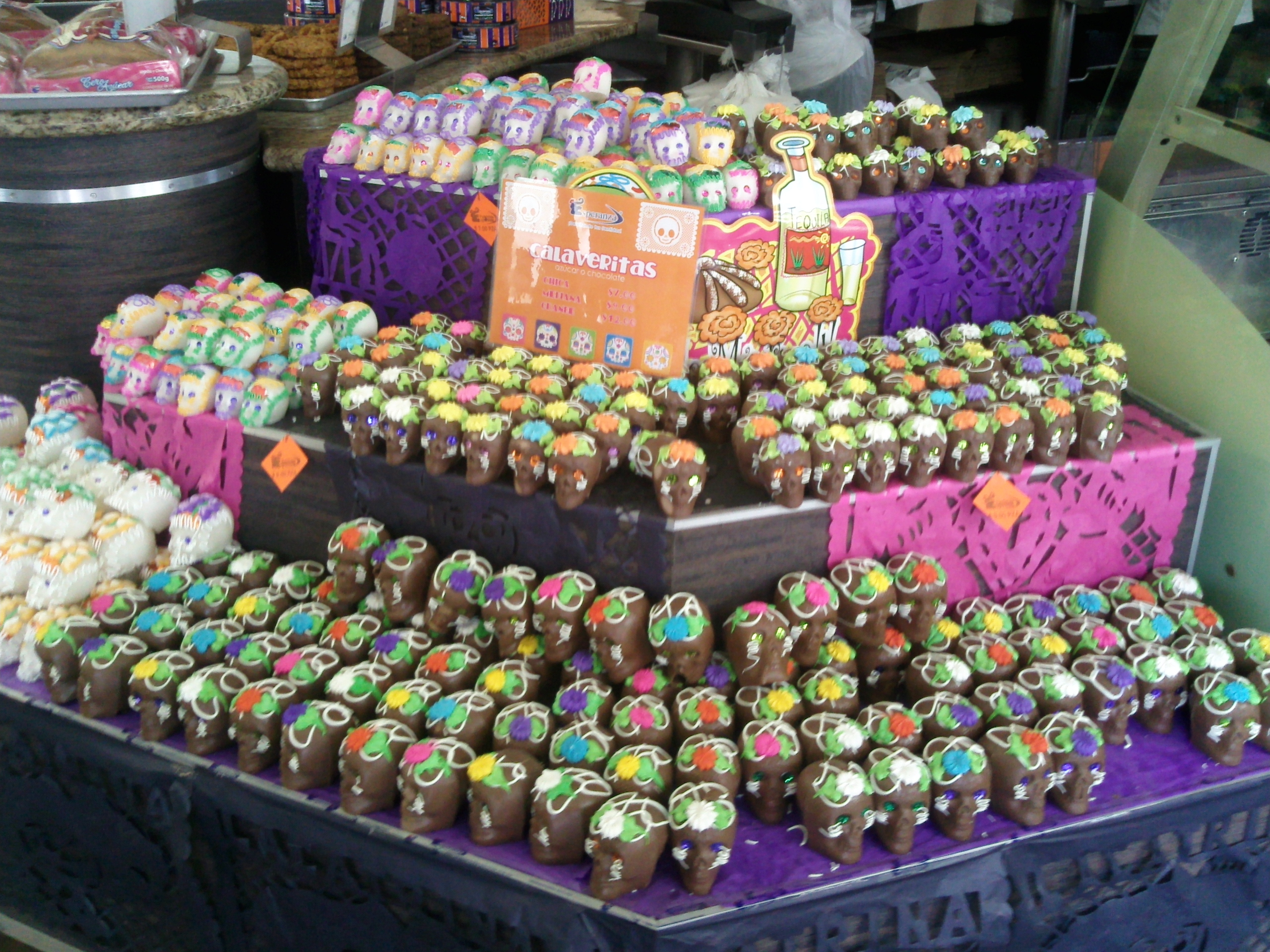
"Calaveritas" (little skulls) made of chocolate and sugar for sale in Mexico.

Traditional production methods with molds have been used for a long time. The process involves using molds to cast the Calaveras. Production can be a lengthy process: a craftsman who creates elaborate Calaveras might spend four to six months producing and decorating the skulls for a season. The most elaborately made sugar skulls are considered folk art, and are not meant to be consumed.

The production process is more focused on the aesthetic appeal of the skull than on the taste or food safety of the product. Furthermore, many sugar skulls(Calaveras) feature inedible decorations, such as beads, feathers, and foil. Some skulls are decorated with sombreros, although these designs are not as popular as they were in the 1970s.

The Calaveras are traditionally sold at outdoor market stalls beginning days or a couple of weeks before the Day of the Dead. The most famous place to purchase sugar skulls and related confections (chocolate, marzipan, candied vegetables, etc.) is the Alfeñique fair in Toluca, which is near Mexico City.

Some Calaveras are produced to be edible. Most are cast as one piece from cane sugar, which can either be left unflavored or else flavored with vanilla. Some Calaveras are also made from chocolate. The Calaveras are typically colored with vegetable dyes. As with the more decorative Calaveras, these will sometimes have names written on the foreheads, as well. Calaveras may be eaten, or kept for a few days and then thrown away.

== Clay skulls ==
Clay toy variations of Calaveras also resemble the shape of human skulls. These toys are often painted a metallic silver color, but they may also be found in colors such as white, black, and red. Beaded eyes of many colors may also be added for decoration.

== Literary Calaveras ==
Poetry written for the Day of the Dead are known as Literary Calaveras, and are intended to humorously criticize the living while reminding them of their mortality. The important precedent for this development is the first illustrated paper that was published in Mexico. Called El Calavera, it began publishing in 1847, illustrated with a skull-faced figure, but the paper was quickly suppressed. An "offering" to President Benito Juarez illustrated with skull and bones was published in 1871. Today literary Calaveras are given to family members and friends; published and illustrated versions satirize celebrities and famous organizations in the press.

Literary Calaveras flourished in the late 19th century, accompanied by drawings that satirized important politicians. Living personalities are depicted as skeletons, exhibiting recognizable traits, making them easily identifiable. Additionally, drawings of fictional dead personalities often contained text elements providing details of the deaths of various individuals.

== Face painting ==
The act of painting a human face to resemble a skull, sometimes known as facepainting, "sugar skull" make-up, Catrina, or Calaca face paint, is not a traditional practice during Day of the Dead (except for Catrina impersonators). However, it has become popular in recent years, particularly in urban centers.

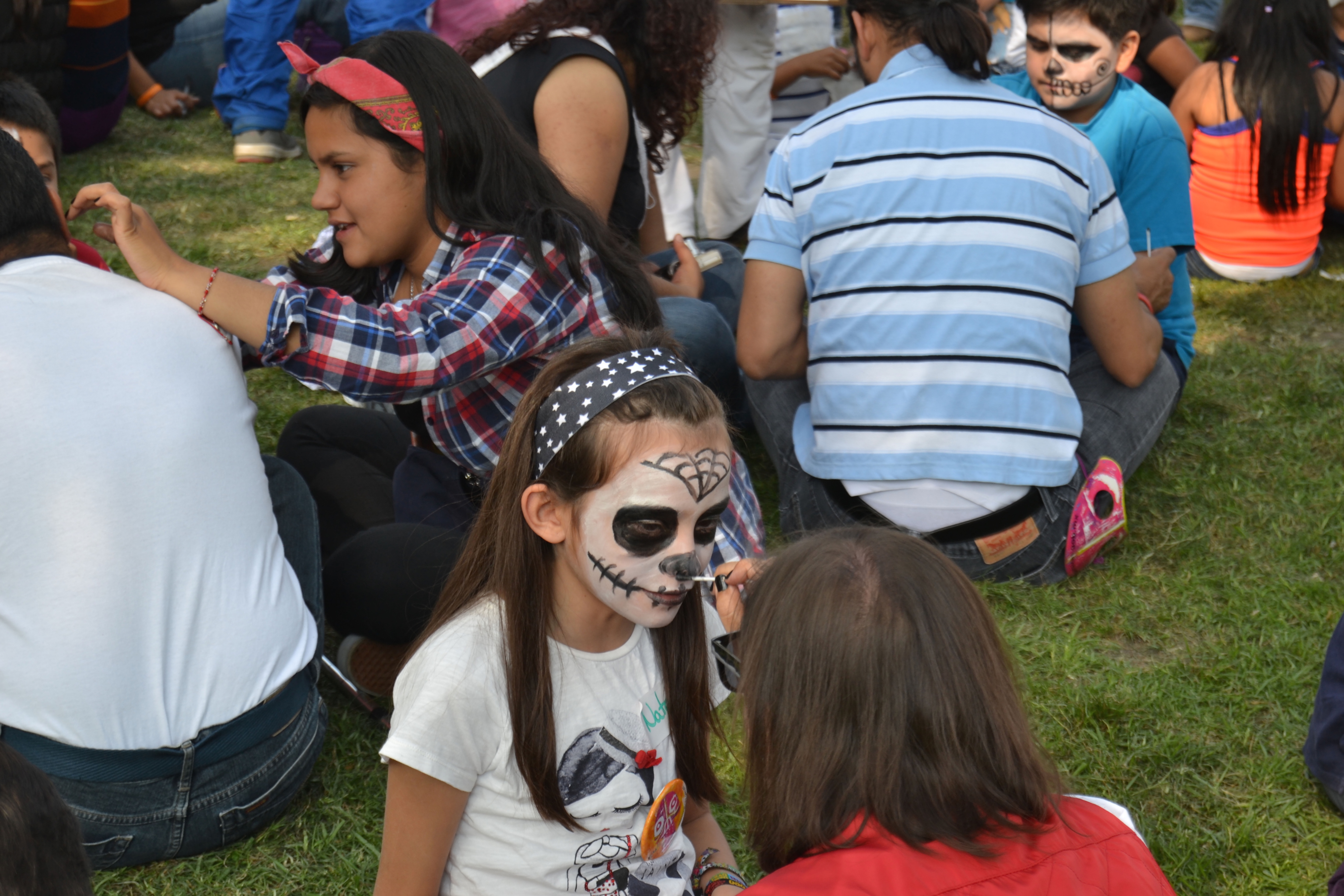
Girl has face painted in Mexico City, celebrating Day of the Dead, 2014.

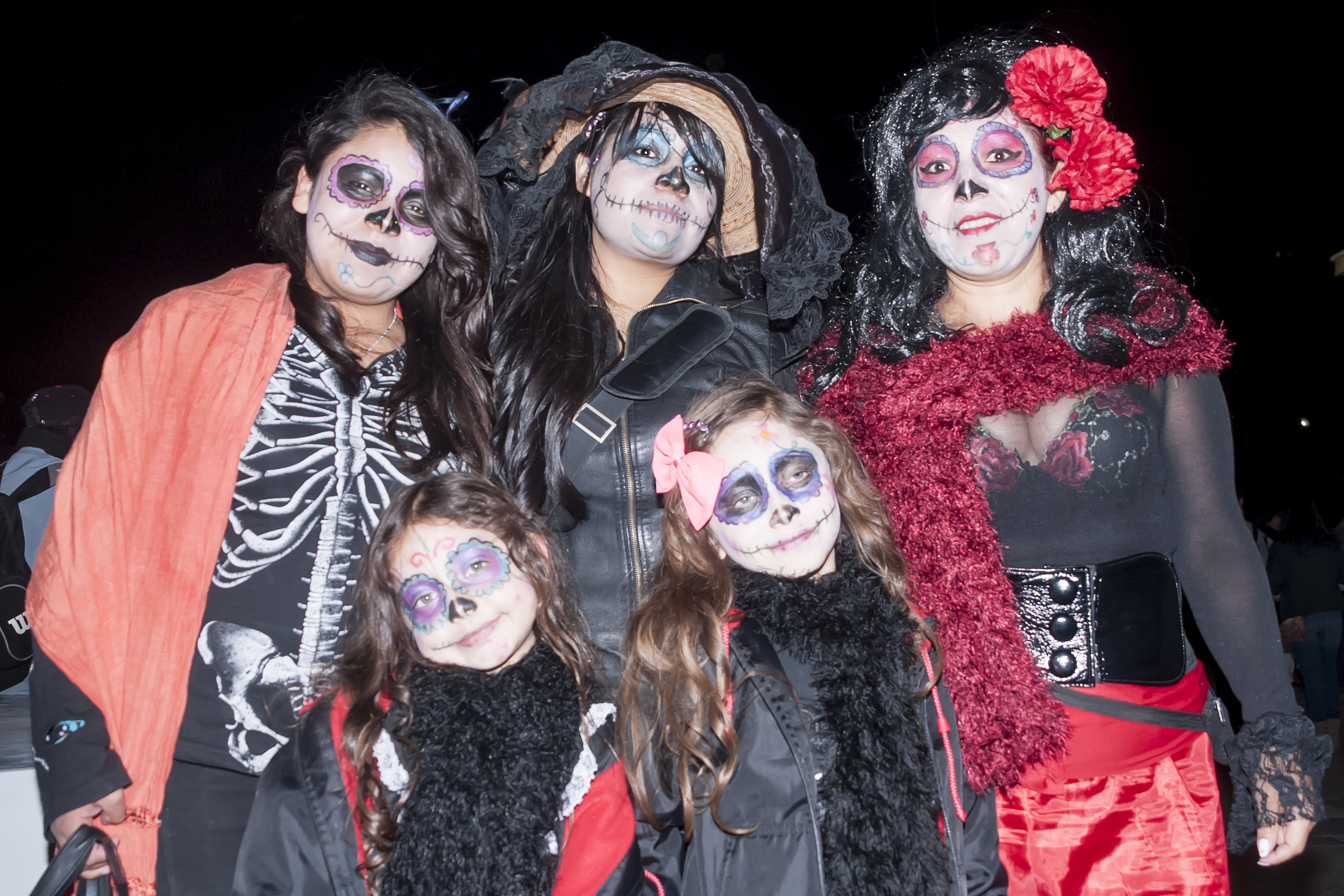
People photographed in Mexico City, celebrating Day of the Dead.

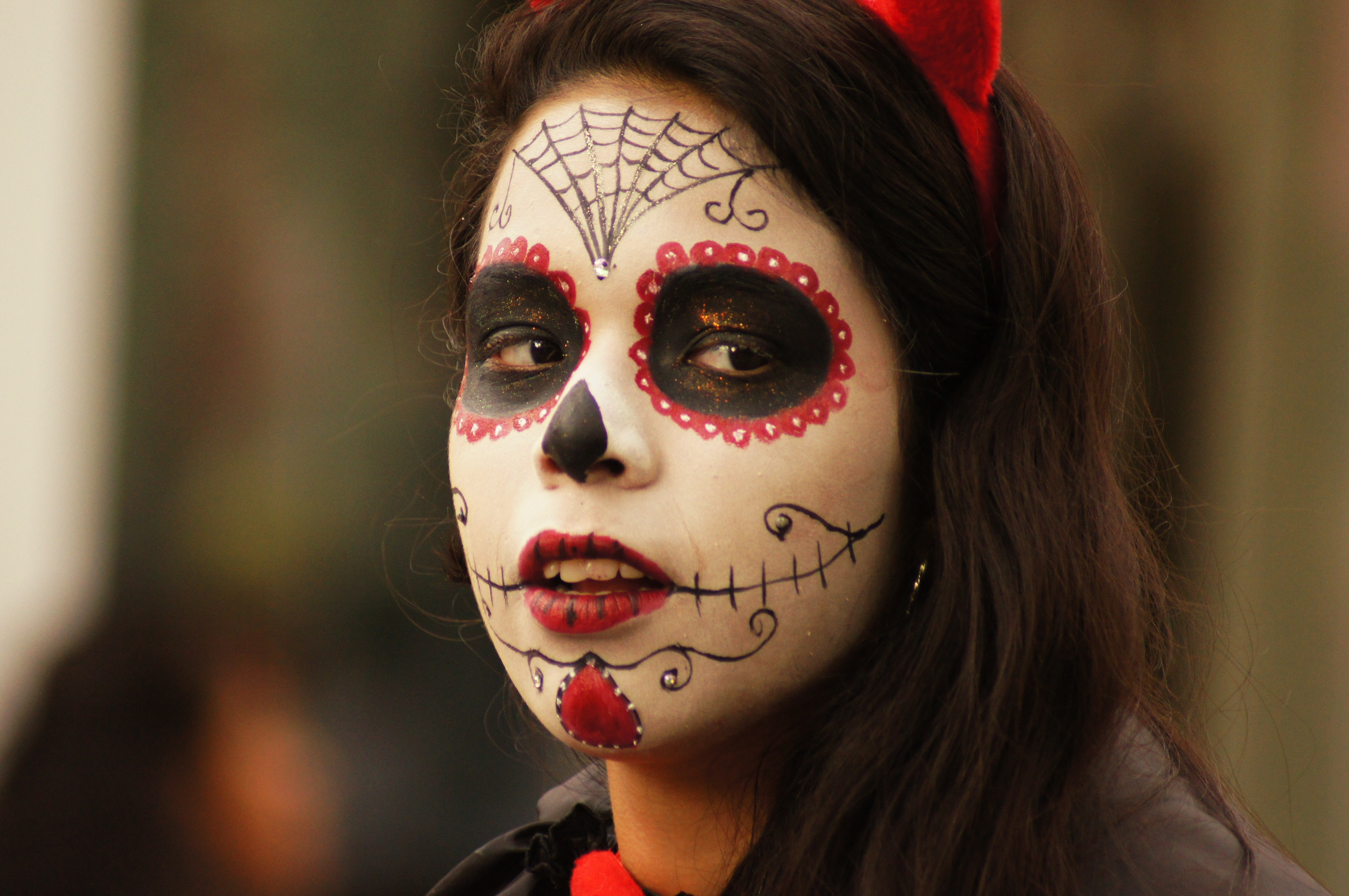
Sugar skull make-up.

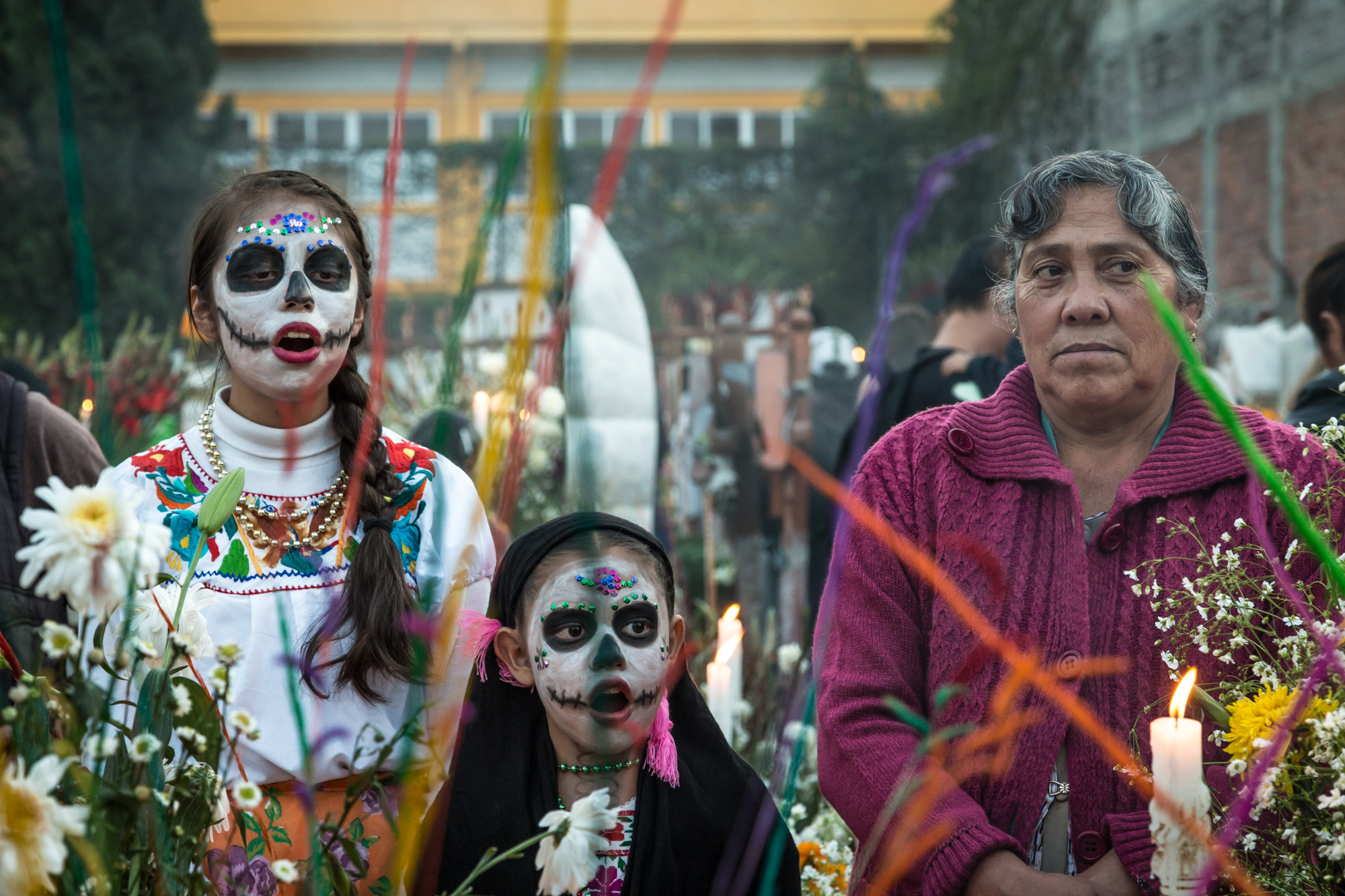
Girls with sugar skull make-up photographed in Mexico City, celebrating Day of the Dead, 2014.

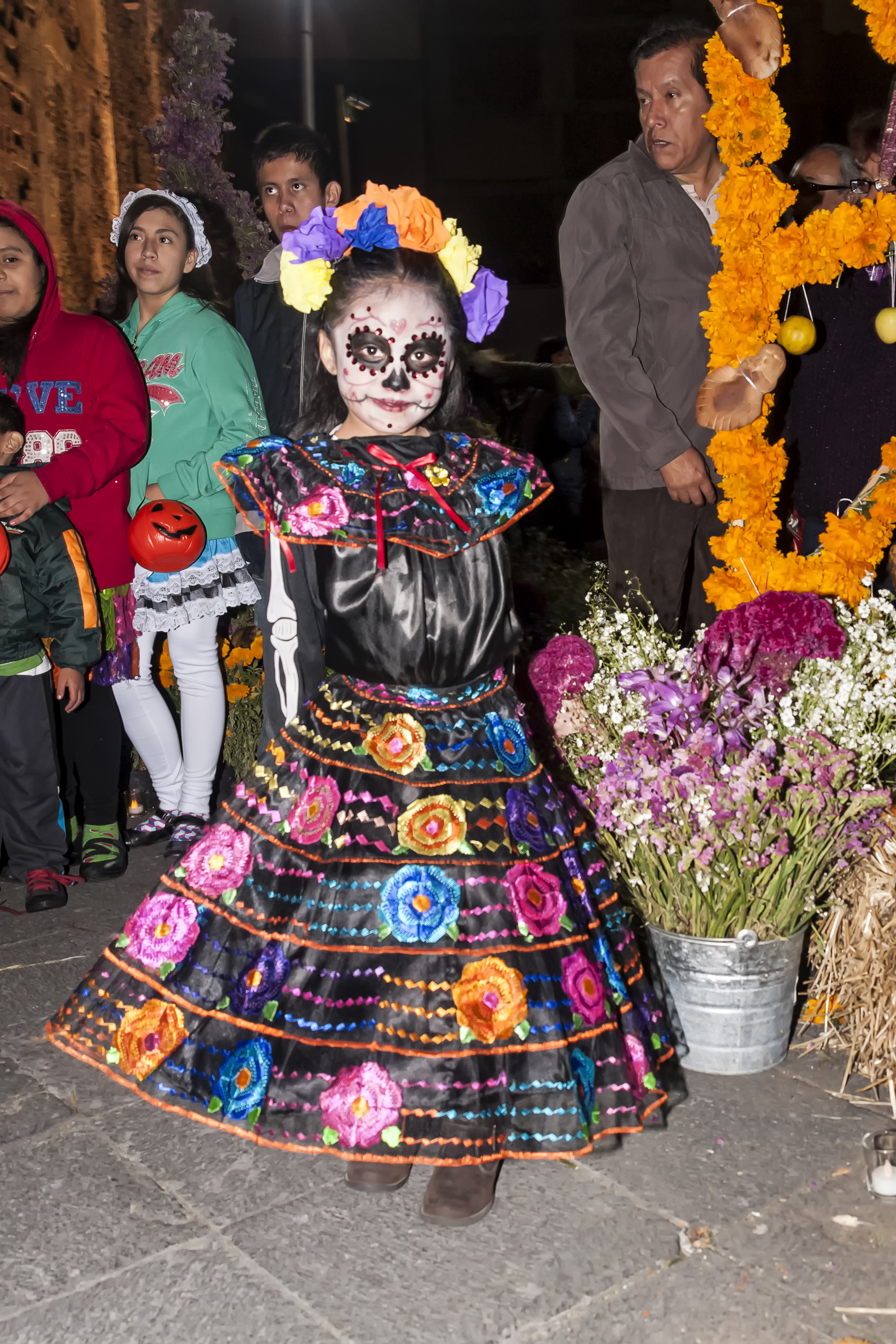
Girl with sugar skull make-up photographed in Mexico City, celebrating Day of the Dead, 2014.

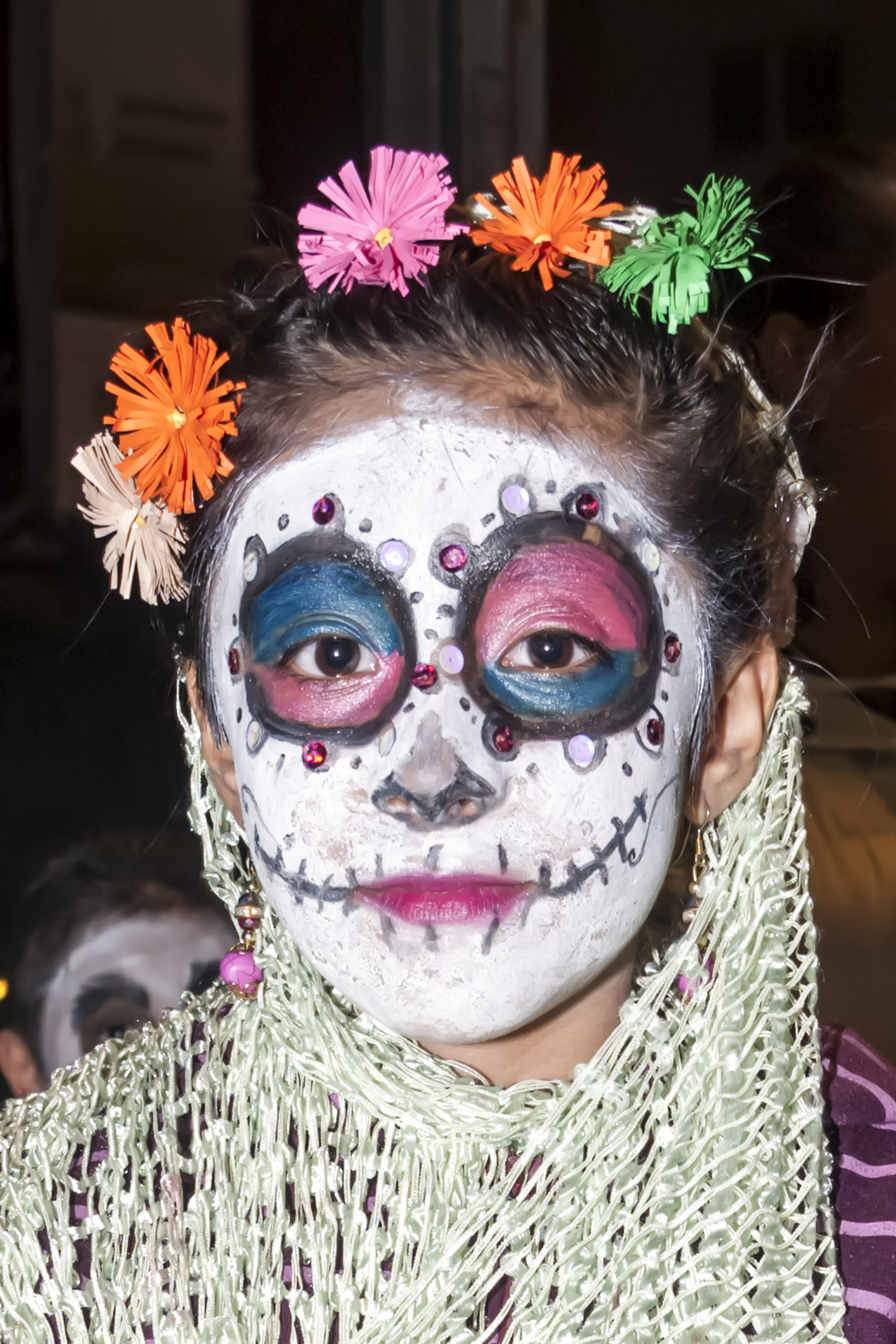
Girl with sugar skull make-up photographed in Mexico City, celebrating Day of the Dead, 2014.

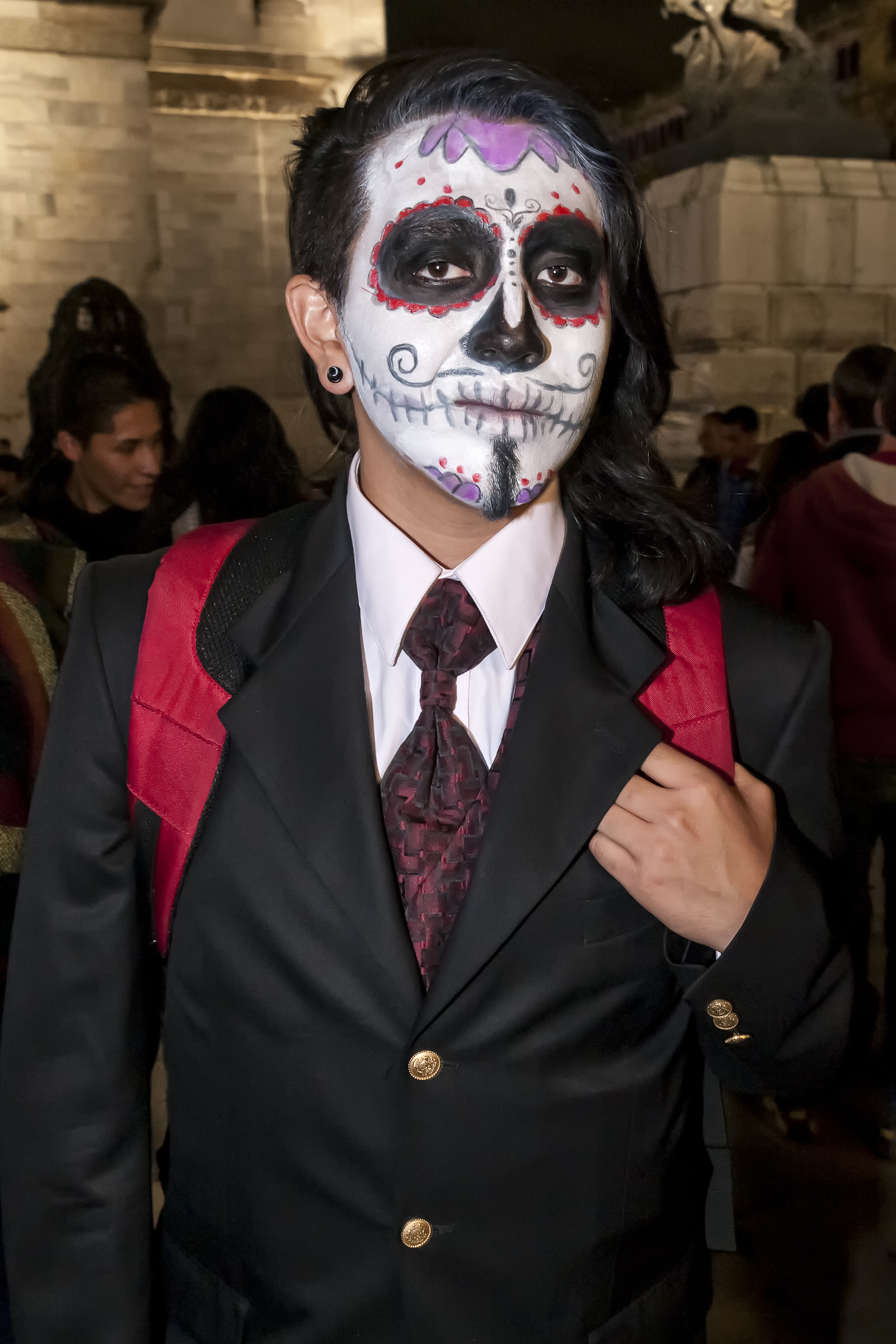
Man with sugar skull make-up photographed in Mexico City, celebrating Day of the Dead, 2014.

== See also ==
- Calaca
- Grim Fandango
- La Calavera Catrina
- Papel picado
- Santa Muerte
