= Colonia Morelos =

- Colonia
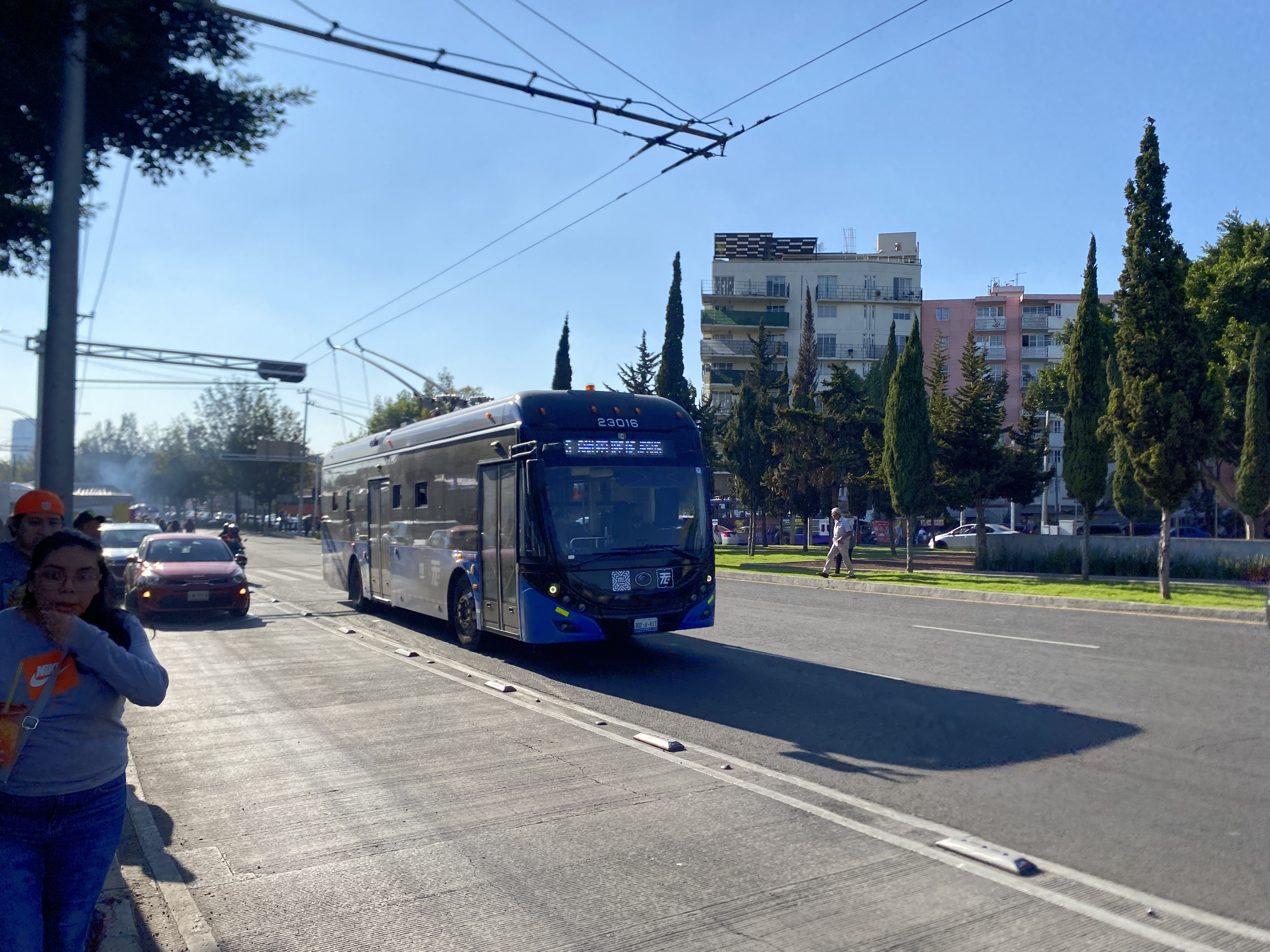
- Bus in Colonia Morelos

- Location within Mexico City
- Coordinates: 19°26′50.1″N 99°7′31.87″W
- Country: Mexico
- City: Mexico City
- Borough: Cuauhtémoc

Population (2010)
  - Total: 36,590

Colonia Morelos is a colonia located just north of the historic center of Mexico City in the Cuauhtémoc borough. It has been a poor area since Aztec times, with many residents today living in large tenements called vecindades. The area, particularly the Tepito neighborhood, is known for crime, especially the sale of stolen merchandise and drugs. It is home to the very large Tepito tianguis or market, and also has two major places of worship dedicated to Santa Muerte.

== Description ==
The boundaries of the colonia are defined by the following streets: Canal del Norte on the north, Paseo de la Reforma on the west, Eje 1 Norte Heroes de Granaditas on the south and Eje 1 Oriente Av. Del Trabajador on the east.

The colonia, especially the Tepito neighborhood, is known as a high crime area in Mexico City. It is known for the handling and selling of stolen merchandise as well as drug dealing, mostly of marijuana. According to a city statistics, 14.45% of the city’s jail population indicates this colonia as its residence. Another major problem for the area’s infrastructure is the theft of electrical services by residents and businesses tapping directly into overhead wires and bypassing meters. In May 2010, the Comisión Federal de Electricidad (CFE), or federal electricity commission, announced steps to eliminate these practices, as well as the replacement of faulty transformers and other equipment.

Schools, all public institutions, in the area include Bertha Dominguez Preschool Capep Cuauhtemoc 3 Special Needs School, Cedex Jorge Casahonda Castillo Technical High School, Cei Cuautemoc V Primary, Cendi Gdf Tepito 1 Ropa y Telas Primary, Cendi Gdf Tepito 2 Varios Primary, Cendi Gdf Tepito 3 Zona Primary, Dolores Correa Zapata Primary, Escuela de la Musica Mexicana Technical School, Escuela Secudaria Tecnica 3 Technical High School, Escuela Secundaria Tecnica 42 Technical High School, Estado de Durango Primary and Estado de Zacatecas Primary. There is a Houses of Hospitality for Immigrants and the Deported in Mexico and Guatemala located at the Albergue Ejército de Salvación on Labradores Street.

== History ==
This area north of the historic center in Aztec times covered by lake and a small, poor community with lived by fishing and other aquatic activities. It was subdued by the Aztecs quickly, but its original residents were barred from trading in the large nearby Tlatelolco market. It soon became a place to stay for those bringing goods into this market to sell, leading to the Aztec name Mecamalinco, roughly translating to “for carriers.”

After the lake here dried, much of the land was occupied by the Carmen monastery. The city was steadily growing northward up to the monastery’s lands which prevented the building of road north out of town as late as 1864. However, the Reform Laws soon decommissioned the monastery and its lands broken up by new roadways. Colonia Morelos was planned and subdivided by Juan Violante in 1882 on part of these lands. The first housing lots were sold in 1886 and the original extension was diminished as sections broke off to form other colonias. From its beginning, the colonia has been inhabited by the lower-classes mostly laborers and craftsmen, which lived and continue to live in large vecindades or tenements.

In 2007, the city government expropriated two large blocks with the rationale of reducing crime in the colonia located on Tenochtitlan and Jesús Carranza streets, an area locally known as La Fortaleza or The Fortress.

== Tepito ==
Colonia Morelos is best known for its Tepito neighborhood, whose name comes from a Nahuatl phrase Teocultepiton meaning “small hermitage.” Over time, this name was shortened and made easier to pronounce for Spanish speakers. This hermitage was located on what is now a small plaza called “Tepito” (officially Fray Bartolomé de las Casas). Most of the neighborhood is taken up by the large tianguis or open-air market, which covers 25 streets. Tepito’s economy has been linked to tianguis or traditional open air markets since pre-Hispanic times.

Estimates of the area’s population may vary from 38,000 to 120,000 residents, with an estimated 10,000 more who come in during the day to sell. It is famously known as the “Barrio Bravo” or fierce neighborhood. Most crimes here are piracy counterfeit goods but it is robbery that gives the area its reputation and can cause problems for sellers by scaring away their customers.

== Santa Muerte ==
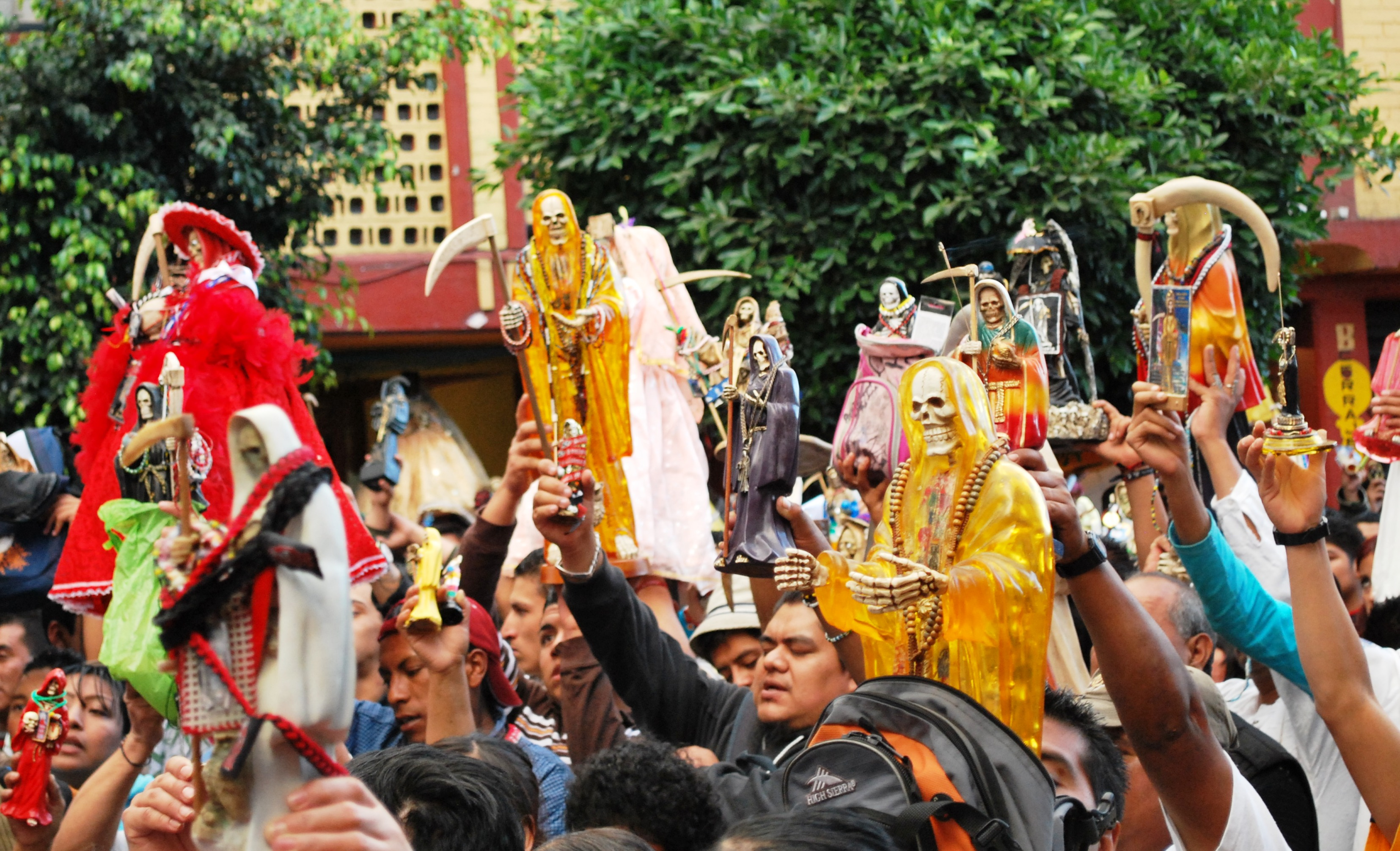
Raising Santa Muerte images during a service for Santa Muerte in Tepito

The colonia is home to two major places of worship of Santa Muerte. The first and best known is the first public sanctuary to be dedicated to the image at the home of Enriqueta Romero Romero. She placed her human-sized image, which had been worshiped privately inside prior, outside her house at 12 Alfarería Street. They eventually led others to do the same. It also attracted visitors. On the first day of every month, Enriqueta leads prayers and the saying of the rosary, which lasts for about an hour. On the first of November the anniversary of the altar to Santa Muerte constructed by Enriqueta Romero is celebrated. The Santa Muerte of Tepito is dressed as a bride and wears hundreds of pieces of gold jewelry given by the faithful to show gratitude for favors received, or to ask for one. The celebration officially begins at the stroke of midnight of November 1. About 5,000 faithful turn out to pray the rosary. For purification, instead of incense, there is the smoke of marijuana. Flowers, pan de muerto, sweets and candy skulls among other things can be seen. Food such as cake, chicken with mole, hot chocolate, coffee and atole are served. Mariachis and marimba bands play.

The other is the Santuario Nacional de la Santa Muerte, the headquarters of the Iglesia Católica Tradicional México-Estados Unidos, Misioneros del Sagrado Corazón y San Felipe de Jesús ("Mexican-US Traditional Catholic Church, Missionaries of the Sacred Heart and Saint Philip of Jesus"). It is based in a house that has been converted for worship purposes, located on Nicolás Bravo Street 35 in Colonia Morelos, close to Metro Candelaria. Worshipers here tend to be people from the neighborhood and include the very young and the very old. The sanctuary here contains a cross, an Archangel Michael and the Virgin of Guadalupe as well as Santa Muerte, on the main altar adorned with flowers. The church claims that it is still a traditional Catholic Church which also includes rituals, workshop and other activities dedicated to Santa Muerte This has caused controversy and disputes with the government over its legal status.

At a cost of 38 million pesos (€2m, US$3m), the church will construct the first temple dedicated to Santa Muerte in Mexico City. The building will occupy 200 square metres (2,200 ft^{2}) on two floors with space to seat 500 people, with crypts, an open-air baptismal, offices and an audiovisual room. The altar will contain three images: a gold-covered Christ, a traditional image of Santa Muerte and an angel. The facility is scheduled to begin operations in September 2010, and includes plans to produce music and videos for the faithful to transmit over the Internet or a church TV station.
