= Daniel Manrique =

Mexican artist (1939 - 2010)

Daniel Manrique (November 28, 1939 – August 22, 2010) was a Mexican artist whose life and work mostly revolved around his home neighborhood of Tepito in Mexico City. He was born into a poor family, who did not support his artistic ambitions, but he maintained his Tepito identity despite. Manrique is best known for his mural work, which depicts the life and popular culture of poor urban neighborhoods such as Tepito, as well as aspects of Mexican and Latin American history since the Spanish conquest. Most of this work was done in Tepito as part of the program he founded called Tepito Arte Acá, but he also did murals in other countries such as Canada and Argentina. His work and the work of Tepito Arte Acá has been recognized by UNESCO, several universities, the Museo de Arte Moderno, CONACULTA, INBA and he was accepted into the Salón de la Plástica Mexicana.

== Life ==
Daniel Manrique (Daniel Manrique Arias) was born on November 28, 1939, in the Tepito neighborhood of Mexico City. He described his mother, as the “classic Mexican woman,” able to put up with much and loyal to her husband but without ambition. He described his father as hard-working but a womanizer and drunk. He said that he had a happy childhood but that he also suffered hunger and poverty. He began working early, first with an uncle that sold used clothing and another that had a pulque bar. His talent for drawing appeared at a very young age, but he was not a very good student. Between working to help the family and being rebellious teenager, he did not finish primary school until he was sixteen. At that time he dropped out and swore to never work on another’s schedule again. However, he considered himself ambitious, not for awards but rather to do what he wanted in life. He stated that he came from class of people who thought of not much more than obtaining their next meal. He self described as “crazy” and “stubborn” for wanting to do something more.

In 1958, he began studying art at first with the Taller Libre de Arte para Obreros (Free Art Workshop for laborers), which led to studies at the Escuela Nacional de Pintura, Escultura y Grabado "La Esmeralda" finishing in 1962. He suffered hunger and family problems while he was in school as his mother did not support his ambition to study painting, and according to Manrique, did not understand why he wanted to study art and “abandon” his responsibility to help support the family.

His art career is strongly connected to his life in the Tepito neighborhood, which is known as the “fierce neighborhood” (barrio bravo). Especially in his early career, he continued to support himself with odd cleaning and transport jobs. Two things that distinguished him from other artists was his propensity to dress in black and his speech style which often included a type of double entendre called an “albur” and other word play.

Through his life, he remain well known and mostly respected among the residents of Tepito, although he moved out from there in the late 1980s into another Mexico City neighborhood called Nueva Atzacoalco, where he lived until his death. He was married to Brisa Avila until his death, which whom he had three children. His oldest, Daniel Manrique, Jr. is also an artist who lives in Houston. He chronicled his life in an autobiography called “Tepito Arte Acá” named after the art and social organization he founded.

Manrique died on August 24, 2010, while he was still an active artist, soon after painting murals in Argentina and working on plans for another in Mexico. For a couple of years prior, he had suffered from diabetes, which created complications such as partial paralysis. The cause of death was an embolism, which was also a diabetes complication. He was buried at the Jardines del Recuerdo in the State of Mexico.

== Career ==
His work can be found on a variety of spaces from tenements to universities in countries such as Canada, the United States, Spain, France and Argentina along with Mexico. However he is best known for his work related to his home neighborhood of Tepito. This dedication began in earnest in the early 1970s. In 1973, he worked with other artists to create an exhibition called “Conozca México visite Tepito” (Get to know Mexico, visit Tepito), which was held at the José María Velasco Gallery (part of INBA), which not only included art, but also popular music played by live bands. This led to the foundation of Tepito Arte Acá (Tepito Arte Here) in 1974 by him along with. The project involved a number of cultural activities, but Manrique was the most dedicated to the project, creating murals, graphic arts and stencil art on tenements, streets and underground passages. He promoted the work of the projects in various ways, including at the Architecture Biennial of 1980 at the Centre Georges Pompidou in Paris, an artist exchange with the lower-class neighborhood of La Saulaie in Oullins, France in the 1980s and from 1985 to 1986, he had examples of the work on display at the Museo de Arte Moderno in Mexico City. The project received recognition from UNESCO in Warsaw.

His best known artistic work is mural painting. Most of this work was done in the Tepito neighborhood and other parts of Mexico City. Other parts of Mexico City include the Organización de Colonos Campamentos Unidos, as well as in Colonia Valle Gómez, Colonia Obrera, Colonia Doctores, at the Escuelita Emiliano Zapata de Santo Domingo and the Pedregales in Coyoacán. Outside of Mexico, his murals can be found in Vancouver, Toronto, Hamilton, Winnipeg and Paris.

Notable murals include one at the Instituto Nacional de Energía Nuclear (1972), one at the Tepito-Guerrero Auditorium, (1980, redone in 2000), three murals in Toronto, Hamilton and Winnipeg at the request of Argentine exiles in Canada (1982), various murals for UNAM, Universidad Autónoma Metropolitana -Xochimilco and the Universidad Pedagógica Nacional (1980–1983), murals in Tepito and other areas in Mexico City commemorating the 1985 Mexico City earthquake (1985–1988), three murals for the Latin American Studies Department of Simon Fraser University (1990s), mural at the Clavería roundabout in the Azcapotzalco borough of Mexico City (2000), Morelos sports center (2001), mural at McMaster University in Hamilton (2002), a series of murals in collaboration with the Galería José María Velasco in Mexico City (2003–2008), mural at the CECYT-IPN in Mexico City (2008), mural on the Los Palomares (La Fortaleza) tenement in Tepito (2009), and murals on the conquest of the Americas in La Plata and Mar del Plata, Argentina (2009). He had two major uncompleted works. In 1991, he was invited to travel to Spain by the Bartolomé de las Casas Association and the city of Puerto Real in Cádiz along with Ecuadorian painter Oswaldo Guayasamín to create “Monument in Memory of the Victims of the Discovery of the Americas in 1492” but the project was canceled due to political considerations. At the time of his death, he was planning a mural in Mexico City about the Mexican Revolution.

In addition to his mural work, he was also an essayist, columnist, intellectual and promoter of Mexican popular culture, writing especially about Tepito and the history of art. His writings include “Para qué sirve el arte… para nada” (For what does art serve... nothing), a collection of essays about both popular and high culture, as well as a musical theater piece called “Pulque para dos” (Pulque for two). In addition to Tepito Arte Acá, he founded two other organizations, Ñeros en la Cultura and Campamentos Unidos por la Guerrero collectives in the 1970s.

Manrique did not exhibit his work in art galleries, but he did exhibit in a number of other venues which earned him recognition. In 1971 he received an honorable mention at the Concurso Nacional de Pintura with a work called “El Acero.” In 1979 he received the Acquisition Prize at the Second Biennial of Painting in Gabrovo, Bulgaria and the International Acquisition Prize in Painting in Turkey in 1980. In 1992, he received the Acquisition Prize at the fifth Diego Rivera National Biennial. In 2005 he participated in the first Encuentro Internacional de Arte en Resistencia at the Universidad de Chapingo. In 2006, he was invited to participate in the Encuentro de Muralistas mexicanos y argentinos (Mexican and Argentine Muralist Encounter) in Buenos Aires.

Other recognitions for his work included acceptance into the Salón de la Plástica Mexicana in 2008, and a catalog of his work along with the work of Tepito Arte Acá published by the Galería José María Velasco, CONACULTA and INBA. After his death, he received a number of tributes which include a 2011 exhibition at the Capilla Británica in Mexico City, an exhibition and special lottery drawing from the National Lottery of Mexico (2011), a special exhibition at the Salón de la Plástica Mexicana in 2012, and another tribute from the Cuauhtémoc borough of Mexico City in the same year.

== Artistry ==
Although best known for his mural work, he also created canvases, sculptures and drawings. He did not like to exhibit his work in art galleries as he did not like the patronizing aspect of art dealers. His philosophy was that an artist’s role is to process the concepts that arise in a culture or people and then return them to the same people. He did not consider himself an innovative artist but rather one who documented the reality of Tepito and communities like it. He believed that art should have a social function and could do much to remedy social problems including decreasing crime. For this reason, he did much of his work along with social organizations especially the Unión de Colonos de Santo Domingo in Coyoacán and Campamentos Unidos in Colonia Guerrero. He also supported various other projects in popular culture, such as the Miss Lupita project of Carolina Esparragoza.

Mexican popular culture and ordinary life in poor urban neighborhoods features in much of his work as a way to bring attention and value to this class of people. Images that appear in his work include tenements, pulque bars, drunks, musicians, indigenous people, bricklayers, organ grinders, tamale vendors, shoe makers and even neighbors fighting. They also include local heroes such as soccer players and boxers along with historical figures, especially from the Conquest and forward. He stated that popular culture influenced much of his creativity, productivity, informality, improvisation and spontaneity.

His Tepito work is the strongest example of his social commitment, which also foreshadowed stencil art and graffiti murals. His work is in many parts of Tepito including streets such as Tenochtitlán, Florida, Aztecas, Fray Bartolomé de las Casas, Eje 1, Caridad, Rivero, Carpintería and Ferrocarril de Cintura. He considered Tepito as representing most authentic Mexican history as well as the most authentic of its culture, especially popular culture since 1521. In one of these murals, he painted the words. “Tequipeuhcan (lugar donde empezó la esclavitud). Aquí fue hecho prisionero el Emperador Cuauhtemotzin la tarde del 13 de agosto de 1521”. (Tequipeuhcan (place where slavery began). Here was where Cuauhtémoc was captured on August 13, 1521. One of his best known works is a 100-meter murals on the Los Palomares tenement, also known as La Forealeza (The Fortress), one of the most notorious of Tepito. aqui los murales de daniel.
