= Tepito =

Neighborhood in Cuauhtemoc, Mexico City

- Barrio of Mexico City
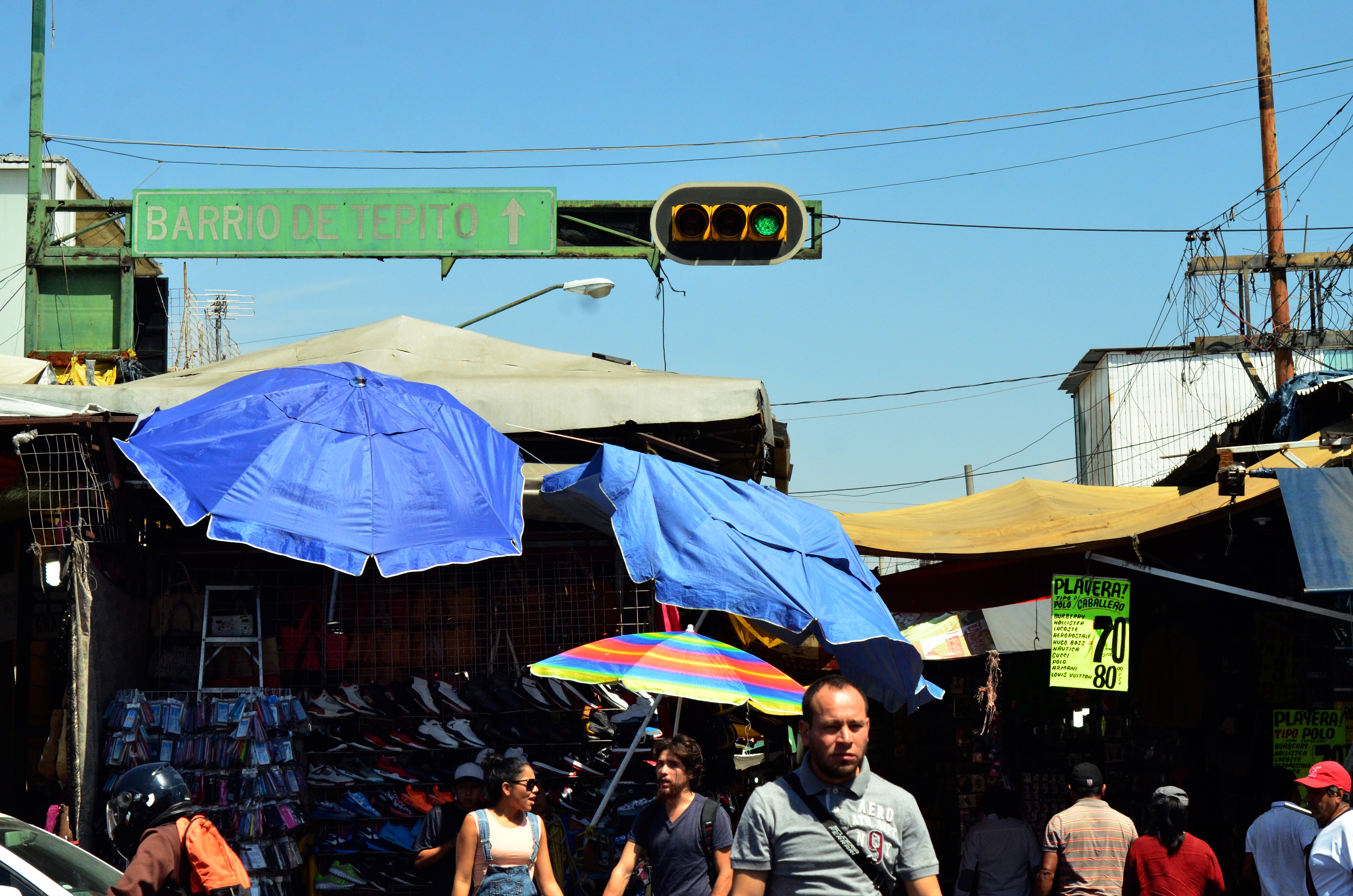
- View of Tepito

- Location within Mexico City
- Coordinates: 19°26′44″N 99°07′42″W
- Country: Mexico
- City: Mexico City
- Borough: Cuauhtémoc

Population (2024)
  - Total: 35,000

Tepito is a barrio located in Colonia Morelos in Cuauhtémoc, a borough of Mexico City bordered by Avenida del Trabajo, Paseo de la Reforma, Eje 1 and Eje 2. Most of the neighborhood is taken up by the colorful tianguis, a traditional open-air market. Tepito's economy has been linked to the tianguis since pre-Hispanic times.

According to a 2018 paper, it has long had a "reputation for crime, poverty, and a culture of lawlessness."

Estimates of the area's population vary from 38,000 to 120,000 residents, with an estimated 10,000 more who come in during the day to sell in the market. It also has been a lower-class neighborhood since pre-Hispanic times, which has known crime since the same period. It is famously known as the "Barrio Bravo" or "fierce neighborhood". Most crimes here involve the counterfeiting of goods but it is robbery that gives the area its reputation and can cause problems for sellers by scaring away their customers.

Tepito is home to a distinctive subculture that has attracted the attention of academics and artists. Art exhibitions have been based on Tepito and the area boasts a number of literary journals to which residents contribute.

== History ==
The name Tepito comes from the Nahuatl teocali-tepiton, meaning small temple or chapel. There is a folk etymology for the name as well. The story states that when a group of policemen were about to go on their rounds one night, one advised the rest that "Si veo a un ratero te pito" ("If I see a thief, I'll whistle at you") with the last two words fusing to become the name of the neighborhood. The frequency that the police had to use their whistles in the neighborhood became a sign of fear, of the resignation of authorities and the pride of the locals.

Archeological finds indicate that this was a poor area in early Aztec times that lived by fishing and other activities related to the lake which it was situated at the time. It was subdued by the Aztecs quickly, but its original residents were barred from trading in the large nearby Tlatelolco market. It soon became a place to stay for those bringing goods into this market to sell, leading to the Aztec name Mecamalinco, roughly translating to "for carriers."

At the time of the Spanish conquest, there was a small temple called Teocultepiton, which the Spaniards shorted to Tepito, eventually making it the name of this area, which was still outside of the city of Tenochtitlan (Mexico City). Similar to Aztec times, this area became filled with inns for caravans of donkeys and other transport bringing goods for the markets of Mexico City. At the same time, indigenous merchants who had lost their wealth and status from the Tlatelolco market settled here to trade. They were joined by long distance merchants who decided to stay.

Tepito remained outside the city proper until well into the 19th century with life here relatively unchanged. More merchants came into the area as large informal markets (tianguis) were pushed out of the city center over the course of the colonial period and the early decades after Independence.

During the Mexican–American War, residents of Tepito, along with Mixcalco and Candelaria de los Patos, fought the army of Gen. Winfield Scott, throwing things at them from their houses, and stealing horses and killing soldiers under cover of darkness. In retaliation, the General Scott ordered the neighborhood bombarded and razed.

When railroads were built in the late 19th and early 20th centuries, they took over the task of bringing goods to market, and the inns that sheltered merchant travelers became tenements. In 1901, the decision was made to close the El Volador market, the last major tianguis in the city center, just south of the National Palace and relocate the merchants to the Tepito area. El Volador was a baratillo or baratijo, a tianguis market for selling new goods at very low prices. This is the origin of Tepito's role as a baratillo. Prior to this, most of the goods sold here were used, especially used clothing and utensils.

The Revolution saw the foundation of the influential Casa del Obrero Mundial, a revolutionary organization at the heart of the Mexican worker's movement, in Tepito. In the 1920s, many people from Jalisco and Guanajuato came here to escape the Cristero War and many settled in Tepito. Many were shoemakers, and this area became known for shoes. It also became an important producer of clothing and recycled household electrical items.

The reduction of buildings here to tenements and the crowding from the influx of Cristero War refugees turned the area into Mexico City's first slum.

By 1945, it was considered one of the worst places to live in Mexico. Houses here were not really houses but rooms varying between thirteen and twenty-five square meters grouped around common areas without sanitation facilities. These groups consisted of ten to fifty units and called "vecindades". Given the conditions and cheap rents, the area attracted delinquents, drunks and prostitutes. After World War II, the city froze rents, which was supposed to be temporary. However, the residents here have not permitted a repeal of their low rents, which have essentially remained unchanged since this time, despite attempts by landowners and government to do so.

In the 1950s four permanent markets were constructed for the various trades (foodstuffs, shoes, and secondhand items), confirming the area's status as a commercial center.

The 1985 earthquake destroyed most of the 17th and 18th-century buildings, killing many residents and leaving many to find housing elsewhere. This led to a new influx of outsiders into Tepito. Tepito was one of the neighborhoods served by the government's Renovación Habitacional Popular program, which rebuilt the damaged vecindades and sold the new homes on credit to their former tenants.

For decades, both government and developers have tried to transform the area. Mayors promise to clean it up and owners of the land there have tried various legal and other methods to get rid of the current residents to sell or redevelop the property. Coordinated plans to transform the area have tried to move residents to the outer parts of the city but residents here have resisted successfully so far.

One of the few successful efforts to evict and demolish tenements here occurred in 2007, when the adjoining properties of Tenochtitlan 40 and Jesus Carranza 33 were demolished. The area was a complex of 144 tenements known as "La Fortaleza" (The Fortress) where about eight kilos of cocaine and a half ton of marijuana was moved each day. As the tenements were being destroyed a number of curious finds appeared such as safes, false walls, murals, such as Pancho Villa smoking pot, reserves of cognac and champagne and even a Jacuzzi.

The city's Secretary of Public Safety stated that 411 convicts or ex-convicts were living in the tenements on Jesus Carranza and Tenochtitlan, most of which had been in jail for assault and/or robbery. The land expropriated by the government was excavated by the National Institute and Anthropology and History (INAH). Findings included both pre-Hispanic and colonial-era items. The site was redeveloped into the Family Integral Development (DIF) community center for Cuauhtémoc borough.

== Tianguis street market ==
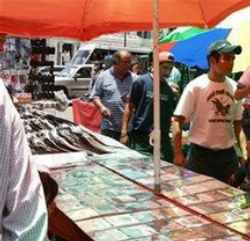
A vendor selling unlicensed CDs in Tepito.

There is a saying, en Tepito todo se vende menos la dignidad ("in Tepito everything is for sale, except dignity"). It has a well-known street market or tianguis, which occupies 25 streets as well as three other markets, one for foodstuffs, one for shoes and one for secondhand items, with most residents here making a living as merchants with about 12,000 doing business here.

The market is a Mexican tradition that dates back to pre-Hispanic times, with the word tianguis coming from Nahuatl. The tianguis at Tepito is called a baratillo or baratijo (lit. little cheap ones) for their traditionally low prices. This market has a long tradition here and is the largest and most vibrant in the city in the 21st century. The market is so large and so crowded that buses must crawl and squeeze their way slowly with only feet to spare at most from the crowds and market stalls.

The sale of counterfeit brands, called fayuca, began in the 1970s. It started small, selling from suitcases but rapidly the quantities rose to pickup loads to tractor trailer loads. Sellers used to go to the U.S. to get merchandise, but many now deal with counterfeit goods coming to Mexican ports from China. Many of the Chinese wholesalers even offer credit. Another widespread phenomenon is the unauthorized selling of copyrighted audio and video. Vendors selling this, most of it copied in Mexico itself, have small television sets with large speakers blaring music at full volume. The electricity for this is tapped illegally, with several stands hooked up to the same cable. It is estimated that street vendors earned as much as 80,000,000,000 pesos in 2005 and avoided 22,000,000,000 pesos in taxes.

There is a used clothing market on Wednesdays on Tenochtitlan Street where garments are sold for as little as one peso. It is generally not stolen but rather bought or bartered for by merchants in lower and middle-class neighborhoods. On Sundays, there is a large antiques market on Paseo de la Reforma. A local dish most often sold from wandering shopping carts in the street here is called migas. It is a stew made with water, ancho chili, beef and pork bones and pieces of bread.

The street sellers of Tepito and other parts of the city form a large part of the financing of political parties in Mexico City. The Party of the Democratic Revolution has governed the city since 2000 and the charge to these vendors to ignore their activities can be anywhere from thirty pesos a week to 100 pesos a day during campaigns. When multiplied by the half million or so street vendors that are estimated in the city, it is a lot of "black money" for politicians.

== Crime ==
Tepito has historically been home to working-class and economically marginalized residents. Even in the pre-Hispanic times when Mecamalinco's residents were barred from the Tlatelolco market, there is evidence that some of the merchandise sold here were stolen goods. Most of Tepito is filled with the huge open-air market, or tianguis, and most of the criminal activity occurs in the form of selling counterfeit items and stolen goods.

Seven out of ten illegally copied or counterfeit products consumed in Mexico go through this neighborhood, despite the fact that it is only blocks away from the Procuraduría General de la Republica. In 2009, federal agents confiscated fourteen tons of unauthorized audio and video, dismantled an audio laboratory and arrested three people during a raid in Tepito. In an earlier raid, federal and city police seized twenty five tonnes of illegally copied material and contraband cigarettes. PROFECO analyzed twenty nine randomly selected alcoholic beverages sold in Tepito and results indicated that all were counterfeit and adulterated, not matching the brand of the packaging.

While the sale of counterfeit or stolen goods is still the main crime here, drug trafficking has made inroads as well. The sale of counterfeit goods took off here beginning in the 1970s, until vendors here were bringing it here from ports and the U.S. border by the truckload. Instead of sending the trucks back empty, contact between these merchants and drug traffickers were established so that the trucks now return with loads of marijuana. Their ready availability has now made drugs a problem for youths in the area.

Arms trafficking, including assault weapons, has also escalated in Tepito, a "phenomenon" described in the Mexico City newspaper El Universal on 4 May 2010, and expanded upon in a piece in MexiData.info.

However, the crime which causes the neighborhood's reputation of being "bravo" or fierce is robbery. Thieves track people who come to the market and look to see who makes what kinds of purchases. Then the chosen victims are confronted. Most of these confrontations do not end in violence as the threats are usually enough to intimidate the chosen victim. Another popular method of robbing is to assault a pedestrian while riding by on a motorbike. In 2006, 317 robberies against people in the street were reported for this area. This and police raids have had the effect of scaring away customers from the tianguis’ vendors.

Mexican cartel headquarters

Tepito is considered the birthplace of one of Mexico's most violent drug cartels, The Tepito Union ("La Unión Tepito"), which is considered the 3rd most powerful cartel in Mexico and an outspoken enemy of notorious cartels such as the La Familia Michoacana, CDS (Sinaloa Cartel) and CJNG (Jalisco New Generation Cartel), who seek to take over territories currently controlled by the so-called "Chilango Cartel" (as La Unión Tepito is known in Mexico).

== Boxing in Tepito ==
Boxing is a tradition in Tepito, and metro line B has a symbol of a boxing glove for the Tepito station. It is thought that some boxers use the neighborhood's reputation as a barrio bravo (fierce neighborhood) to gain respect. With Kid Azteca, boxing became a tradition. The increase in fayuca (the selling of stolen goods) may have reduced the number of champions hailing from Tepito.

The first boxer from Tepito, Kid Azteca, inspired Mexico in 1932. At the time, the neighborhood was poorer than it is today; many houses were made of scavenged wood.

Tepito's boxing tradition continued until the 1980s. The next boxer from Tepito to achieve international fame was Raul "El Raton" Macias, who became one of the most popular boxers in Mexican history and filled a Mexico City stadium with 50,000 spectators in 1954. When El Raton died in 2009, the Mexican government declared a national day of mourning.

From 1955 to 1974, another boxer from Tepito was Jose Huatlacoche (who had a 69-31-8 record). Ruben "El Puas" Olivares was a knockout specialist, with a 74-percent career knockout percentage, and was undefeated for 61 consecutive fights.

== Social structure and value system ==
Despite its problems, most residents who live here do not want to leave, as they were born here and have raised their families here. Residents also have some of lowest rents in the city, which compels many to stay as well. Rather than being ashamed of living here, many residents are proud of it. This was captured in a Mexican movie, Don de Dios. The film's tagline and a character mention: "ser mexicano es un privilegio, pero ser de Tepito es un don de Dios", meaning "being Mexican is a privilege, but being from Tepito is a gift of God". Despite its violent theme, it was filmed in Tepito with the support of tianguis vendors.

This neighborhood has had the most success resisting modernization, preserving many of its traditions and customs. The social system here is communal, rather than individualistic. In many ways, the assemblies and organizations mirror those of village assemblies in the indigenous areas of the country. While there is no formal vote, decision eventually get made through general consensus.

Many sociologists, writers, singers, filmmakers, journalists and anthropologists have been interested in Tepito and its way of life because in many ways it is the origin of many of the attitudes and cultural expressions of Mexico City. Tepiteños (residents of the area) have their own set of slang and other forms of expression, some of which have been copied by the middle and upper classes.

As a barrio bravo there are two "myths" that endure here. The first is summarized with the phrase a la sombra que infunde respeto, literally meaning "to the shadow, which instills respect" meaning that the shadow of the neighborhood's reputation demands that those from the outside treat with the area with a certain kind of respect. Tepito has its own rules and most outside authorities abide by them as it is a rich source of bribe money. The second is referred to as the impuesto de la ingenuidad ("naiveté tax"). This refers to those who believe that the counterfeit items at extremely low prices are real. While it is possible to find great bargains here, many of the sellers here sell fake and/or defective merchandise.

While the area has had a large amount of success, recent developments have weakened the social structure here. Drugs are a problem among youth, and the seemingly easy money to be made from counterfeit items, stolen goods and drugs has caused more individualistic attitudes. It also causes neighbors to not want to be involved with their other neighbors for risk of becoming involved in something unexpected.

== Asian presence ==
There are approximately 2,500 Korean merchants operating in Tepito and the eastern streets of the historic center. Chinese and Koreans now own about 75% of the buildings of the 74 blocks where the tianguis is concentrated. The "Chinese," as most Asians are called in Tepito, began by establishing stalls selling poor quality novelties from their homelands. From there, they branched out to cosmetics, tools, toys, and fragrances at extremely low prices.

== Tepito and Santa Muerte ==
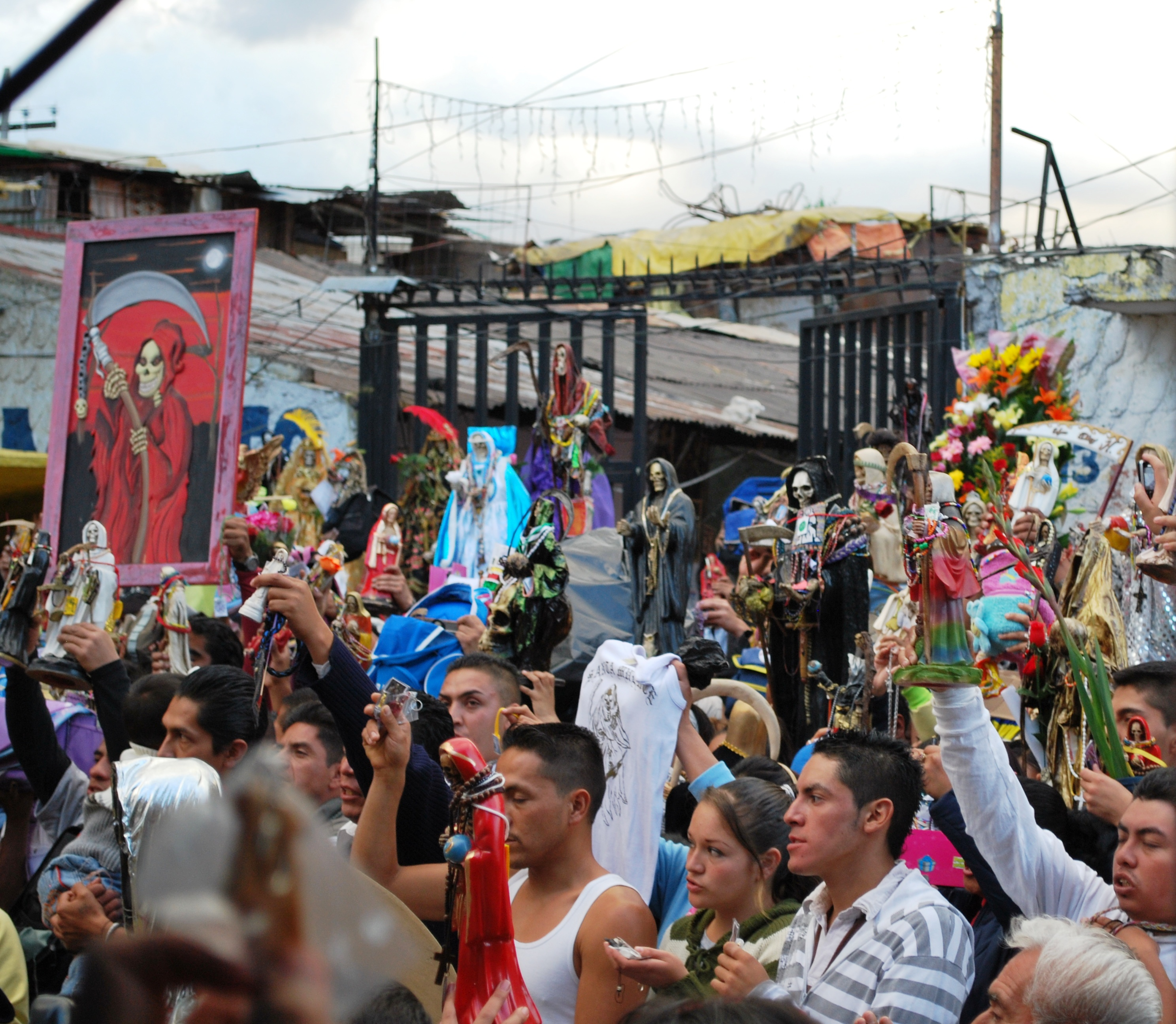
The raising Santa Muerte images during a service for Santa Muerte in Tepito.

The official Catholic saint for the area is Saint Francis of Assisi, whose feast day is 4 October. But most consider Santa Muerte to be the real patron saint of the area.

A believer by the name of Enriqueta Romero Romero, who resides in Tepito, decided to take a life-sized image of Santa Muerte out of her home and build a shrine for it, visible from the street. The image is dressed in different color garb depending on the season, with the Romero family changing the dress every first Monday of the month. Over the dress are large quantities of jewelry on her neck, arms and pinned to her clothing. These are offerings that have been left to the image as well as the flowers, fruits (esp. apples) candles, toys, money, notes of thanks for prayers granted, cigarettes and alcoholic beverages that surround it. Enriqueta considers herself the chaplain of the sanctuary, a role she says she inherited from her aunt, who began the practice in the family in 1962.

The shrine is located on 12 Alfarería Street in Colonia Morelos. The house also contains a shop that sells amulets, bracelets, medallions, books, images and other items, but the most popular item is votive candles.

On the first day of every month, Enriqueta leads prayers and the saying of the rosary, which lasts for about an hour, with approximately 5,000 in attendance.

On the first day of November the anniversary of this altar to Santa Muerte is celebrated. The Santa Muerte of Tepito is dressed as a bride and wears hundreds of pieces of gold jewelry given by the faithful to show gratitude for favors received, or to ask for one. The celebration officially begins at the stroke of midnight of 1 November. About 5,000 faithful turn out to pray the rosary. For purification, instead of incense, there is the smoke of marijuana. Flowers, pan de muerto, sweets and candy skulls among other things can be seen. Food such as cake, chicken with mole, hot chocolate, coffee and atole are served. Mariachis and marimba bands play.

A drug raid on 22 October 2019, led police to a narco-tunnel on Calle Peralvillo where they found 42 skulls, four encrusted in an altar. Other bones, including that of a fetus, along with religious symbols, were also found in the tunnel. The 27 people who were arrested during the raid were released by a judge.

== Notable sites ==
The Centro Deportivo Tepito is better known as El Maracaná because of its soccer field on which three days a week various teams from the barrio compete against each other. Next to the El Maracaná is the José "Huitlacoche" Medel Gymnasium which houses the boxing ring which is another reason the area is called the "barrio bravo" (fierce neighborhood). Here both men and women learn how to box, with most hoping to go pro. For many here, boxing is a social and economic outlet. The neighborhood has long history of producing professional boxers and other athletes, such as Raúl "El Ratón" Macías, Rubén "El Púas" Olivares, Lorenzo "Halimi" Gutiérrez, who won the national flyweight belt, Rodolfo Martinez and the most recent phenomenon, wrestler "Místico."

Perhaps the most well-known spot is an area that was once called "La Fortaleza" (The Fortress). It was a complex of 144 tenements located in the adjoining properties of Tenochtitlan 40 and Jesús Carranza 33. It had been one of the main drug distribution sites in Tepito, moving about eight kilos of cocaine and a half ton of marijuana each day.

In 2007, then-mayor Ebrard put forth a plan to expropriate the property. This caused fear in the area that it was a first step to transformation and expulsion of residents. The community organized and got assurances from the city government that was not the case. While not completely reassured, when the government took possession of the land, there was no resistance. Part of the reason for this was that it occurred very early in the morning without warning and many of the neighbors were tired of the "mafias" that were run from there. The government took over 5,600 square meters of land and arrested thirty three as a warning to other drug and gun runners. It also caused seventy-three families to lose their homes. The city demolished the structures on the properties after expropriation.

The land expropriated by the government was excavated by the National Institute and Anthropology and History (INAH), which found pre-Hispanic and colonial-era artifacts. The most significant of the pre-Hispanic finds was a child's burial, in which an obsidian bead with a duck's head, two other beads and deep plate-like objects called cajetes were found. The burial was found intact, mostly because it was placed deep, about two yards under the first pre-Hispanic structure. Scattered around the site were more cajetes, mortars called molcajetes, dishes painted with eagles, serpents, and figures of Mexica deities, pieces of incensories, parts of musical instruments such as rattles and flutes, obsidian knives and needles made of bone and thorns. Most of these were found around a pre-Hispanic dwelling made of rock and compacted earth.

Finding that date from the colonial era include lebrillos, are clay containers used to store liquids in monasteries and hospitals to store liquids. Many of these have Greek letters, flowers and monograms on them. Lead-glazed pottery (majolica) has also been found along with the remains of 19th-century dwellings. The site is set to become the Family Integral Development (DIF) community center for Cuauhtemoc borough. Construction was begun in September 2008 with a budget of 125 million pesos. Completion of the project has been delayed because it is being supervised by an international organization who damaged that portions of the building under construction be demolished for being defective. The building must meet certain requirements in order to receive ISO-9001:2000 certification.

On the corner of Tenochtitlan and Constancia is the Church of the Immaculate Conception. Although the feast day is 8 December, the crowds come to the church on 13 August to commemorate the apprehension of Cuauhtémoc, the last Aztec emperor. This spot is known in Nahuatl as Tequipeuhcan, which means "place where slavery began". There is a plaque here with a statement Cuauhtémoc supposedly made exhorting Mexica or Mexicans to continue fighting for their own destiny.

== Art and literature of Tepito ==
Conozca México, visite Tepito (Know Mexico, Visit Tepito) was an exposition that occurred in September 1973 and gave rise to the Tepito Arte Acá (Tepito Art Here) movement. This led to the establishment of three art galleries in the neighborhood in the 1950s, with only the José María Velasco Gallery surviving to the present day. This gallery is located on Peralvillo 55 a few meters from Matamoros Street near where many enter Tepito. The gallery was placed here to entice people to come in and see that the area is more than contraband and drugs. The gallery specializes in exhibitions on themes of everyday life in lower-class neighborhoods like Tepito.

One recent exhibition was put together by photographer Francisco Mata and is called Tepito ¡Bravo el barrio! (Tepito, Bravo to the neighborhood!, a play of words on the "fierce neighborhood"). This project is a collection of photographs of everyday life from the streets, alleys, houses, churches and markets of the area. The project was first shown at the José María Velasco Gallery in Tepito, which contained mirrors so that residents could compare themselves to the photos. The purpose of the exhibition is to show a side of the neighborhood other than its bad reputation. The photographer was allowed to meet some of the neighborhood's most notable members such as Rubén Olivares, known as El Tirantes and Enriqueta Romero Romero, in charge of the first public shrine to Santa Muerte. The photos include 600 portraits including sixty of the best-known and thirty images from the street.

The neighborhood has produced a number of writers, one of the best known of which is Fernando Cesár Ramírez. He is the creator and editor of a magazine called Desde el Zaguán which gives non-professional writers in the area a chance to publish their work. It is one of many small journals and fanzines that have been published here, some of which date back to the 1970s. Among them are El Ñero, Desde Tepito, Tepito y Anexas and La Enredadera. Recently, a number of these writings and publications were put together for an exhibition called Dos filos at the José María Velasco Gallery.

== Famous ex-residents ==
- Cuauhtémoc Blanco, footballer and politician
- Cantinflas, actor
- Paquita la del Barrio, singer
- Jaime Bravo, matador
- Místico, wrestler/luchador
- Marco Antonio Barrera, boxer
- Kid Azteca, boxer
- Raul Macias, world champion boxer
- Rubén Olivares, world champion boxer
- Rodolfo Martínez, world champion boxer
- Francisco Laguna Correa, writer
- Carlos Zárate Serna, world champion boxer
