= Alfeñique fair =

Annual event in Toluca, Mexico

Coordinates: 19.2905°N 99.6562°W

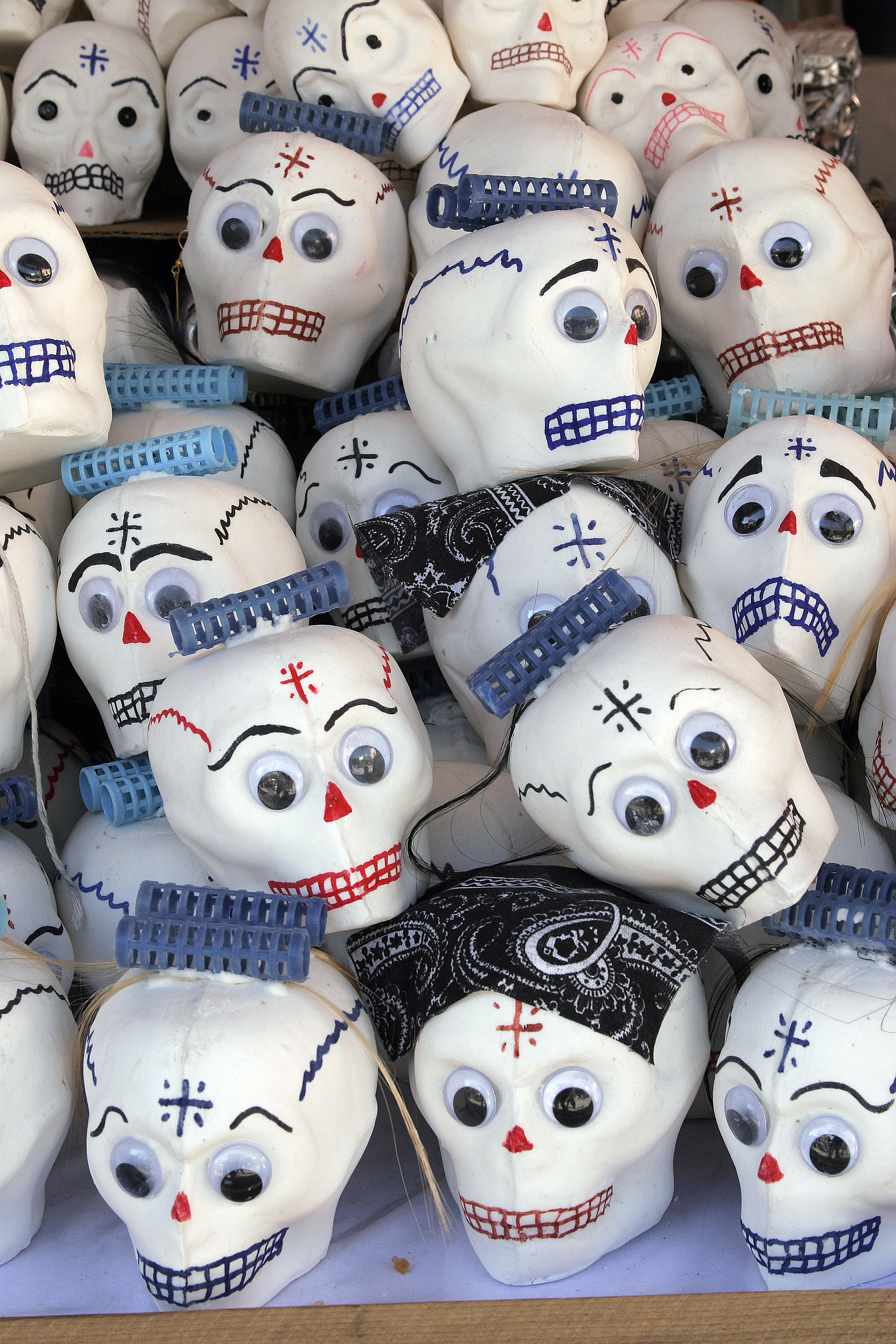
Traditional sugar-made figures in Mexico.

The Alfeñique fair (Spanish: feria del Alfeñique) is an annual event that takes place in the city of Toluca, Mexico in which vendors sell traditional sugar skulls with names labeled on the forehead, as well as candy in a variety of shapes, in order to celebrate the Mexican holiday Día de Muertos (Day of the Dead). Chocolate and sugar skulls are used to decorate altars dedicated to the dead during the celebration.

The fair starts in the middle of October and lasts up to the beginning of November. Hundreds of people sell their wares at Los Portales, a series of arches surrounding the so-called place, where people can go and buy their own skulls for their altars. Every year a contest takes places in order to give a prize to the best candy skull and to the best decorated business.

Alfeñique is an Arabic word "alfainid". This word was referred to the preparation of a pastry of cooked sugar stretched into very thin layers. The alfeñique came along with the Spanish and then the aztecs made figurines with amaranth for their altars. These were known as the first alfeñiques in the New World. In colonial times, the nuns related the “alfeñique” as a traditional figurine for the months of October and November to celebrate Día de Muertos.

There is also an annual Alfeñique fair in the city of Guanajuato.
