= Vecindad =

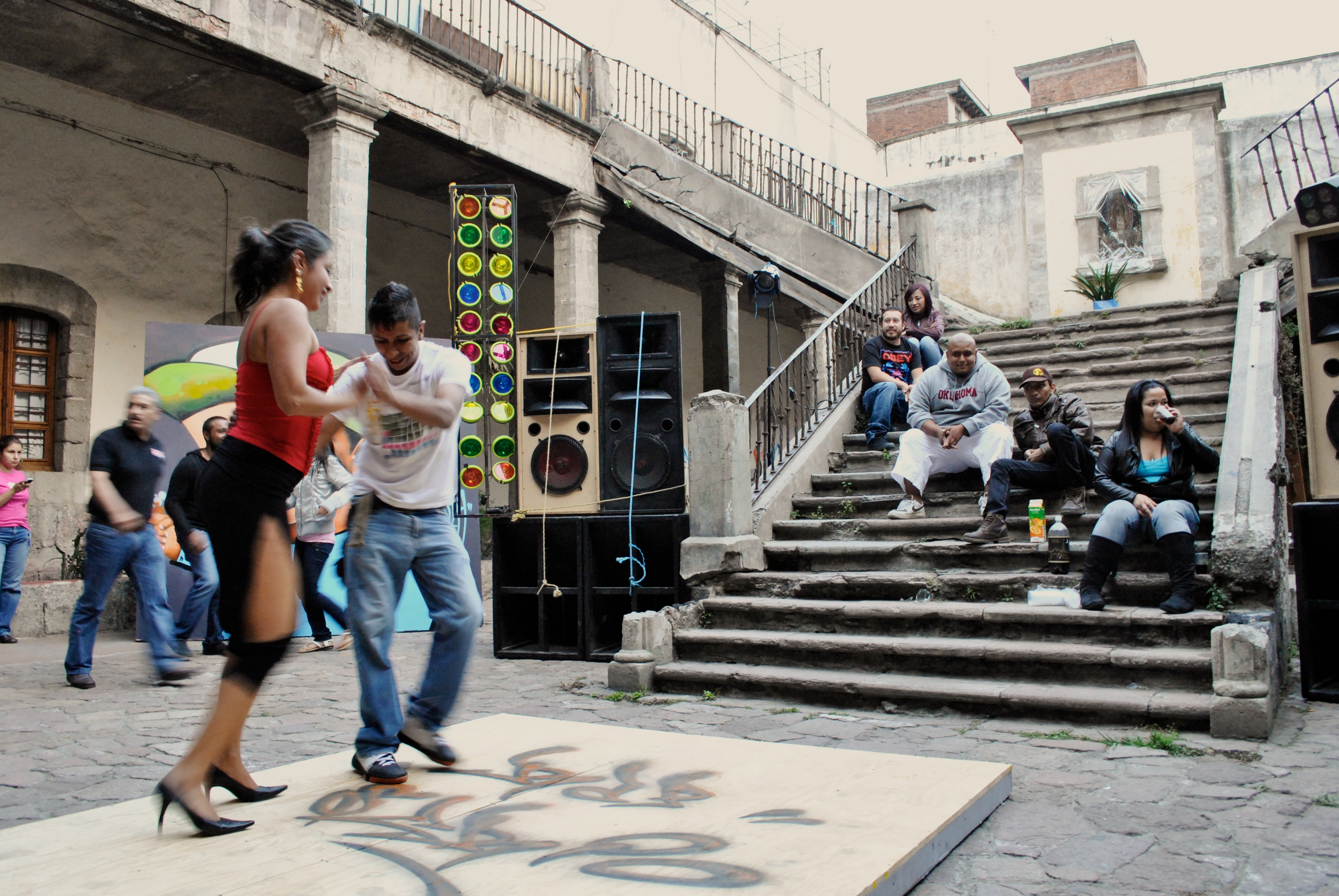
A couple dances cumbia at a party with a sonidero. Vecindad courtyards are common spaces for socializing.

Vecindad (Spanish, 'neighborhood'; concept of householder, citizenship) is a deeply-rooted Hispanic concept with various meanings, depending on historical or geographical context. In Mexico, it is often used to refer to multifamily apartment dwellings converted from aristocratic residences, or designed in similar fashion.

== History ==
In Iberia during the Reconquista from Muslim rule, new towns were founded and to entice settlers, they were offered the status of vecinos, prominent and respected residents and citizens. In colonial Mexico in the immediate conquest era, only encomenderos, those holding grants of the labor and tribute of particular Indian communities, were granted the title of vecino. As Spanish cities were founded in New Spain, vecinos could petition the municipal council cabildo for a grant of land in the municipality to build a house and land outside the municipality to pursue economic activity. As the number of Spanish households increased, the term vecino expanded to mean male head of household and neighbor, and came to mean being a member of Spanish colonial society.

The word vecindad can also refer to a person's legal residence, in terms of a city, province, or state, not just a neighborhood. In Guatemala, there's a national ID referred to as carnet de vecindad, not mattering the actual "neighborhood" but giving the person a legal document saying they are from that country. In parts of for a building containing several (often low-income oriented) housing units. It was originally a form of housing created from a residential subdivision of vacated elite housing in historic centers in Mexican cities, where rooms around a central patio were let to families who shared facilities (such as lavatories and/or kitchens) with the other tenants. Purpose-built vecindades were constructed in the early 20th century to meet the demand for central low-income housing and resembled the original vecindades by having small units and shared facilities. The term is now used ambiguously.

In some Latin American countries the "vecindades" are called "conventillos". The word is a derogative from "convento": cloister. The name comes from the similarity of the spatial distribution of the buildings: covered living spaces around an open court or "patio". Important is the inherent social tissue of the "vecindad/conventillo". The dwellers form a complex communal unit with a varied array of social interrelationships. The outside world, very often, considers the inhabitants of a "vecindad" as a group of slum people and project on them their prejudices against the lower classes.

In the modern era, the idea of vecindad is debated in the European Union.
