= Santa Muerte =

Mexican new religious movement, female deity, and folk saint

Our Lady of Holy Death Nuestra Señora de la Santa Muerte
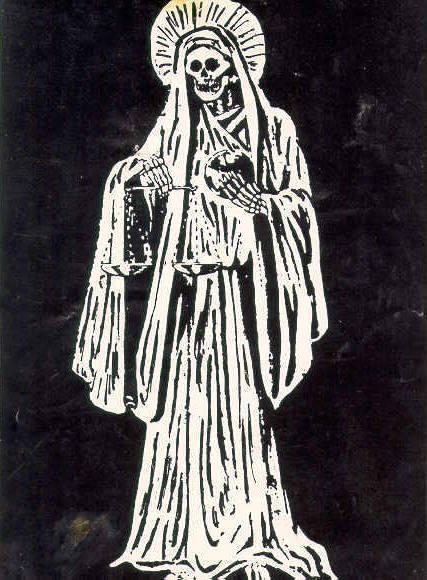
- Illustration of Santa Muerte

Lady of Shadows, Lady of the Night, White Lady, Black Lady, Skinny Lady, Bony Lady, Mictēcacihuātl (Lady of the Dead)
- Honored in: Mexican folk Catholicism and Neo-Paganism, primarily in Central America, Mexico, and Southwestern United States (scant worship in the Caribbean, Canada, and Western Europe)
- Major shrine: Santuario de la Santísima Muerte in Santa María Cuautepec, Tultitlán, State of Mexico
- Feast: August 15, Day of the Dead (November 2), and many public shrines celebrate the date of their founding
- Attributes: Human female skeleton clad in a robe holding a variety of objects including a Scythe, Globe, scale of justice, hourglass, and oil lamp
- Influences: A wide variety of supernatural powers (love, prosperity, good health, fortune, healing, safe passage, protection against witchcraft, protection against assaults, protection against gun violence, and protection against violent death)

Nuestra Señora de la Santa Muerte (Spanish: [ˈnwestɾa seˈɲoɾa ðe la ˈsanta ˈmweɾte]; lit. 'Our Lady of Holy Death'), often shortened to Santa Muerte (lit. 'Holy Death'), is a new religious movement, female deity, folk-Catholic saint, and folk saint in Mexican folk Catholicism and neo-paganism. A personification of death, she is associated with healing, protection, and safe delivery to the afterlife by her devotees. Despite condemnation by the Catholic Church and Evangelical Protestant denominations, her following has become increasingly prominent since the turn of the 21st century.

Santa Muerte almost always appears as a female skeletal figure, clad in a long robe and holding one or more objects, usually a scythe and a globe. Her robe can be of any color or pattern, as more specific images of the figure vary widely from devotee to devotee and according to the ritual being performed or the petition being made.

Her present day following was first reported in Mexico by American anthropologists in the 1940s and was an occult practice until the early 2000s. Most prayers and other rituals have been traditionally performed privately at home. Since the beginning of the 21st century, worship has become more public, starting in Mexico City after a believer named Enriqueta Romero founded her famous Mexico City shrine in 2001. The number of believers in Santa Muerte has grown since 2001 to an estimated 12 million followers who are concentrated in Mexico, Central America, and the United States, with a smaller contingent of followers in South America, Canada and Europe. Santa Muerte has two similar male counterparts in Latin America, the skeletal folk saints San La Muerte of Argentina and Paraguay and Rey Pascual of Guatemala and Chiapas, Mexico. According to R. Andrew Chesnut, a scholar of Latin American history and professor of religious studies, Santa Muerte is at the center of the single fastest-growing new religious movement in the Americas.

== Names ==
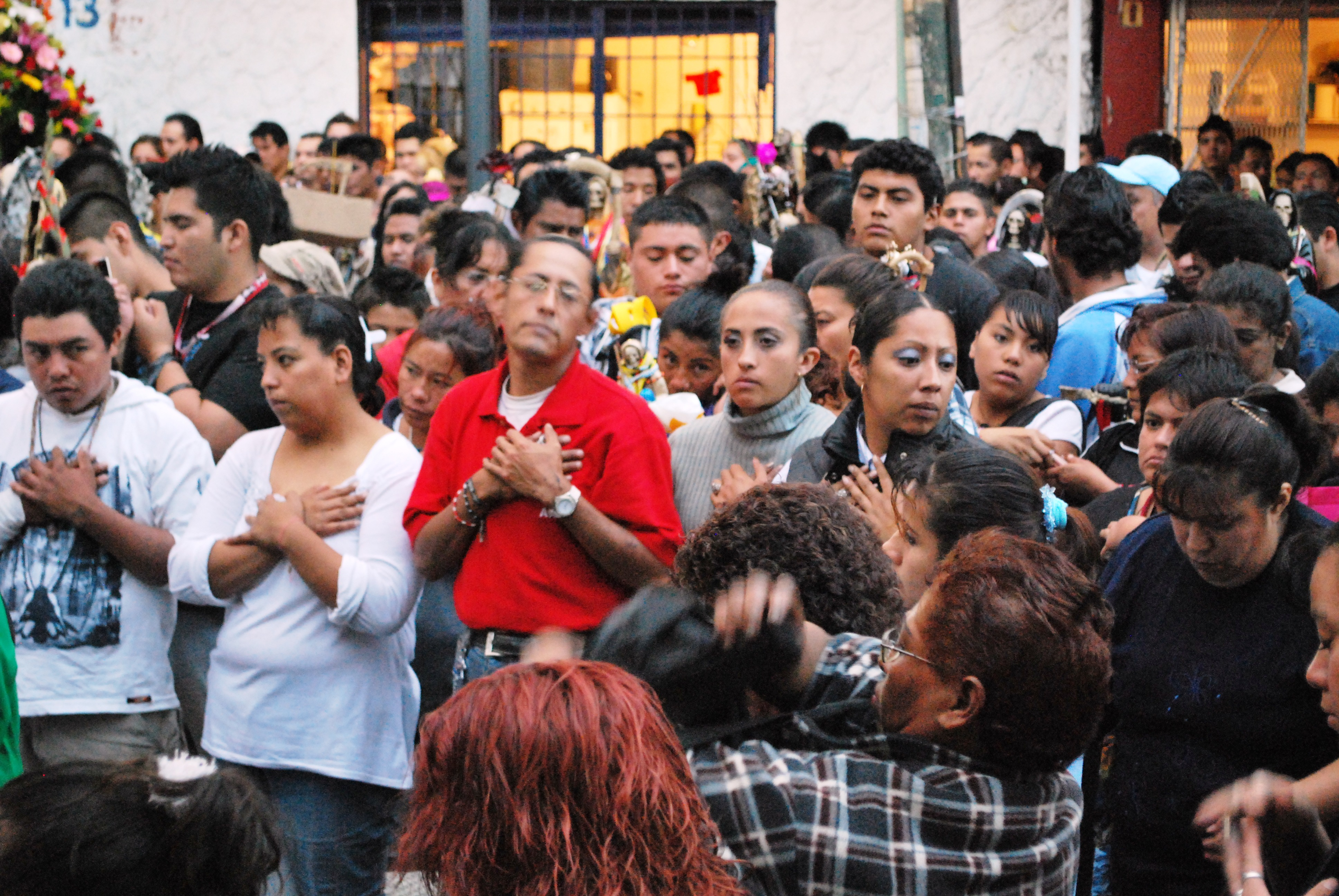
Devotees praying to Santa Muerte in Mexico

Studies about Santa Muerte describe the cult as a religious phenomenon with a complicated history, developed inside Mexican folk worship. Authors have pointed out a combination of elements from Western Christian iconography of death, traditional Catholic devotions, and popular Mexican practices related to death, and, following some interpretations, possible similarities with Mesoamerican thoughts about death and the underworld. However, the existence of a direct, cultural continuity with religions that existed in the region before the arrival of the Spaniards continues to be heavily debated material. According to Claudio Lomnitz and Katia Castañeda, the cult did not seem to come from a religion that existed before the arrival of the Spaniards to the New World, because the Mexican conceptions about death can be analyzed as the result of complex, historical processes(colonial, religious, national, and cultural). This perspective has been used for diverse studies in order to make the assertions about the origins of contemporary religious practices connected to death more nuanced.

Santa Muerte can be translated into English as either "Saint Death" or "Holy Death", although R. Andrew Chesnut, a scholar of the history of Latin America and a professor of religious studies, believes that the former is a more accurate translation because it "better reveals" her identity as a folk saint. A variant of this is Santísima Muerte, which is translated as "Most Holy Death" or "Most Saintly Death", and devotees often call her Santísima Muerte during their rituals.

While historian R. Andrew Chesnut argues that "Saint Death" is the more accurate translation of "Santa Muerte" because it more directly conveys her identity as a personification of death, University of Oxford-trained anthropologist Kate Kingsbury has challenged interpretations of Santa Muerte as solely death personified or as a figure primarily invoked to delay or avoid death. Drawing on ethnoarchaeology, ethnographic research in Mexico, and a decolonial approach to the study of death, Kingsbury argues that such interpretations can reproduce a Western, ethnocentric understanding in which life and death are treated as binary opposites and death as the negation of life. Her ethnographic research instead identifies a non-dualistic understanding in which life and death are interconnected and mutually constitutive. Devotees do not necessarily desire death; rather, they may understand mortality as an unavoidable condition of life and maintain a relationship with death without treating it as its opposite. This is reflected in petitions to Santa Muerte for fertility, childbirth, new beginnings, prosperity, and protection, as well as in accounts of her compassionate role at death. In one ethnographic account, a devotee described a Santa Muerte tattoo as an expression of gratitude to the saint for allowing her mother to die after prolonged suffering from cancer. Some devotees likewise describe Santa Muerte as the figure who receives and protects the dead, while others invoke her for the continuation and flourishing of life. Kingsbury therefore describes Santa Muerte as "life-death conjoined," arguing that her skeletal form can signify the inseparability of mortality and life rather than death as their absolute opposite.

Santa Muerte is known by a wide variety of other monikers: the Skinny Lady (La Flaquita or La Flaca), the Bony Lady (la Huesuda), the White Girl (la Niña Blanca), the White Sister (la Hermana Blanca), the Pretty Girl (la Niña Bonita), the Powerful Lady (la Dama Poderosa), the Godmother (la Madrina), Madre ('Mother'), Señora de las Sombras (lit. 'Lady of the Shadows'), Señora Blanca (lit. 'White Lady'), Señora Negra (lit. 'Black Lady'), Niña Santa (lit. 'Holy Girl'), Santa Sebastiana ('Saint Sebastienne' or 'Holy Sebastian') or Doña Bella Sebastiana ('Beautiful Lady Sebastienne').

== History ==
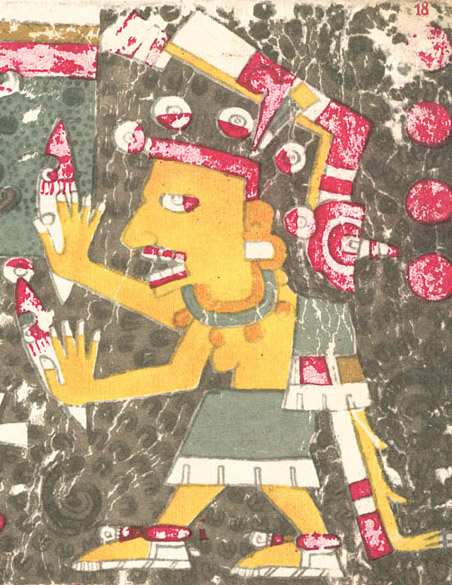
Mictēcacihuātl (or Mictlancihuatl), the skeletal Aztec goddess of death

After the Spanish conquest of the Aztec Empire, the worship of Mictēcacihuātl (or Mictlancihuatl), the skeletal Aztec goddess of death, diminished but was never eradicated. Judith Katia Perdigón Castañeda has found references dating to 18th-century Mexico. According to one account, recorded in the annals of the Spanish Inquisition, Chichimecs in central Mexico tied up a skeletal figure, whom they addressed as "Santa Muerte", and threatened it with lashings if it did not perform miracles or grant their wishes. Another syncretism between pre-Columbian and Catholic beliefs involving death can be seen in Day of the Dead commemorations. During these commemorations, many Mexicans flock to cemeteries to sing and pray for friends and family members who have died. Children partake in the festivities by eating chocolate or candy in the shape of skulls. Perdigón Castañeda, Thompson, Kingsbury, and Chesnut have countered the argument that Santa Muerte's origins are not Indigenous as proposed by Malvido, Lomnitz, and Kristensen, stating that Santa Muerte's origins derive from authentic Indigenous beliefs. For Malvido, this stems from Indigenist discourse originating in the 1930s. Nevertheless, ethnoarchaeological research by Kingsbury and Chesnut, as well as archival work by Perdigón Castañeda, has established clear links between pre-Columbian death deity worship and Santa Muerte supplication.

In contrast to the Day of the Dead, overt veneration of Santa Muerte remained clandestine until the early 2000s. When it went public in sporadic occurrences, reaction was often harsh, and included the desecration of shrines and altars. At the beginning of the 20th century, José Guadalupe Posada created a similar, but secular, figure by the name of Catrina, a female skeleton dressed in fancy clothing of the period. Posada began to evoke the idea that the universality of death generated a fundamental equality amongst all human beings. His paintings of skeletons in daily life and of La Catrina were meant to represent the arbitrary and violent nature of an unequal society.

Modern artists began to reestablish Posada's styles as a national artistic objective to push the limits of upper-class tastes; an example of Posada's influence is Diego Rivera's mural painting Dream of a Sunday Afternoon in the Alameda Central, which features La Catrina. The image of the skeleton and the Day of the Dead ritual that used to be held underground became commercialized and domesticated. The skeletal images became folklore, encapsulating Posada's viewpoint that death is an equalizer.

Skeletons were clad in extravagant dresses with braids in their hair, altering the image of Posada's original La Catrina. As opposed to being the political message Posada intended, the skeletons of equality became skeletal images that were appealing to tourists and the national folkloric Mexican identity.

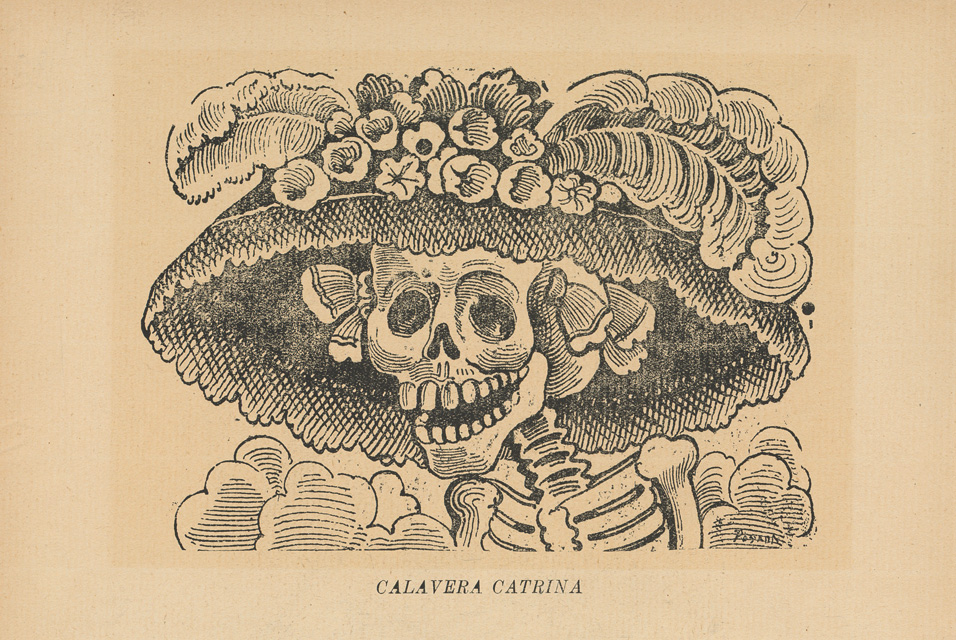
One of José Guadalupe Posada's Catrina engravings (1910–1913)

Veneration of Santa Muerte was documented in the 1940s in working-class neighborhoods in Mexico City, such as Tepito. The new religious movement of Santa Muerte first came to widespread popular attention in Mexico in August 1998, when police arrested the notorious gangster Daniel Arizmendi López and discovered a shrine to the saint in his home. Widely reported in the press, this discovery inspired the common association between Santa Muerte, violence, and criminality in Mexican popular consciousness. At present, Santa Muerte can be found throughout Mexico and also across the United States and Central America. There are videos, websites, and music composed in honor of this folk saint.

Since 2001, there has been "meteoric growth" in Santa Muerte belief, largely due to her reputation for performing miracles. In the late 2000s, the founder of Mexico's first Santa Muerte church, David Romo, estimated that there were around 5 million devotees in Mexico, constituting approximately 5% of the country's population.

By the late 2000s, Santa Muerte had become Mexico's second-most popular saint, after Saint Jude, and had come to rival the country's "national patroness", the Virgin of Guadalupe. The meteoric rise of this new religious movement has engendered considerable controversy. In March 2009, the Mexican Army demolished 40 roadside shrines near the U.S. border. Around 2005, the new religious movement was brought to the United States by Mexican and Central American immigrants, and by 2012 had tens of thousands of followers throughout the country, primarily in cities with large Mexican and Mexican-American populations. As of 2016-2017, devotion to Santa Muerte was the fastest-growing new religious movement in the world, with an estimated 12 million followers, and the single fastest-growing new religious movement in the Americas. The COVID-19 pandemic saw further growth in the new religious movement as many believed that she would protect them against the virus.

== Attributes and iconography ==
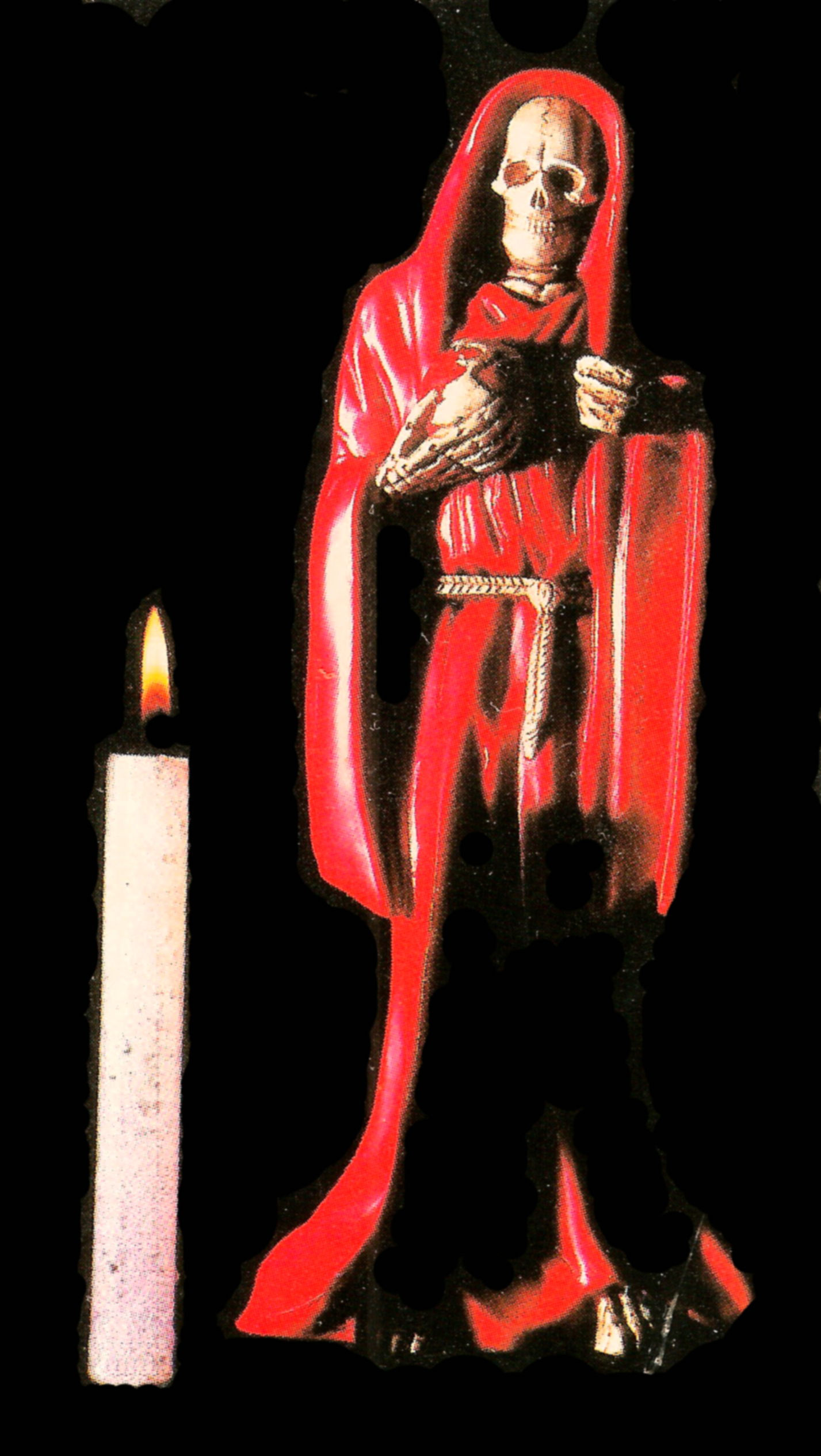
Red figurine of Santa Muerte

Santa Muerte is a personification of death. Unlike other Latin American folk saints, Santa Muerte is not, herself, seen as a dead human being. She is associated with healing, protection, financial wellbeing, and assurance of a path to the afterlife.

Although there are other death saints in Latin America, such as San La Muerte, Santa Muerte is the only female saint of death in the Americas. Iconographically, Santa Muerte is a skeleton dressed in female clothes or a shroud, and carrying both a scythe and a globe. Santa Muerte is distinguished as female not by her skeletal form but rather by her attire and hair. The latter was introduced by a believer named Enriqueta Romero.

The two most common objects that Santa Muerte holds in her hands are a globe and a scythe. Her scythe reflects her origins as the Grim Reaper (la Parca of medieval Spain), and can represent the moment of death, when it is said to cut a silver thread. The scythe can symbolize the cutting of negative energies or influences. As a harvesting tool, a scythe may also symbolize hope and prosperity. The scythe has a long handle, indicating that it can reach anywhere. The globe represents Death's vast power and dominion over the earth, and may be seen as a kind of a tomb to which we all return.

Other objects associated with Santa Muerte include scales, an hourglass, an owl, and an oil lamp. The scales allude to equity, justice, and impartiality, as well as divine will. An hourglass indicates the time of life on earth and also the belief that death is not the end, as the hourglass can be inverted to start over. The hourglass denotes Santa Muerte's relationship with time as well as with the worlds above and below. It also symbolizes patience. An owl symbolizes her ability to navigate the darkness and her wisdom; the owl is also said to act as a messenger. A lamp symbolizes intelligence and spirit, to light the way through the darkness of ignorance and doubt. Owls in particular are associated with Mesoamerican death deities such as Mictlantecuhtli and seen as evidence of continuity of death worship into Santa Muerte. Some followers of Santa Muerte believe that she is jealous and that her image should not be placed next to those of other saints or deities, or there will be consequences.

Many artists, particularly Mexican-American artists, have worked with Santa Muerte's image. One of the images considered to be the most controversial in Mexico is the fusion of Santa Muerte and the Virgin of Guadalupe, into what is sometimes known as GuadaMuerte. This image has been very polemical for many Mexicans as it features Santa Muerte dressed like the Virgin of Guadalupe, in blue veil with stars on it, red dress, with a fiery yellow halo behind her head and often in a praying pose. It has, according to news sources, been so upsetting to the Catholic Church that Santa Muerte leaders in Mexico have advised against its use, while in the Santa Muerte community some leaders and devotees are angered that their powerful, formidable folk saint would be conflated with a completely separate entity, the Virgin of Guadalupe, as the practices are different on many levels.

== Veneration ==
=== Rituals associated with Santa Muerte ===
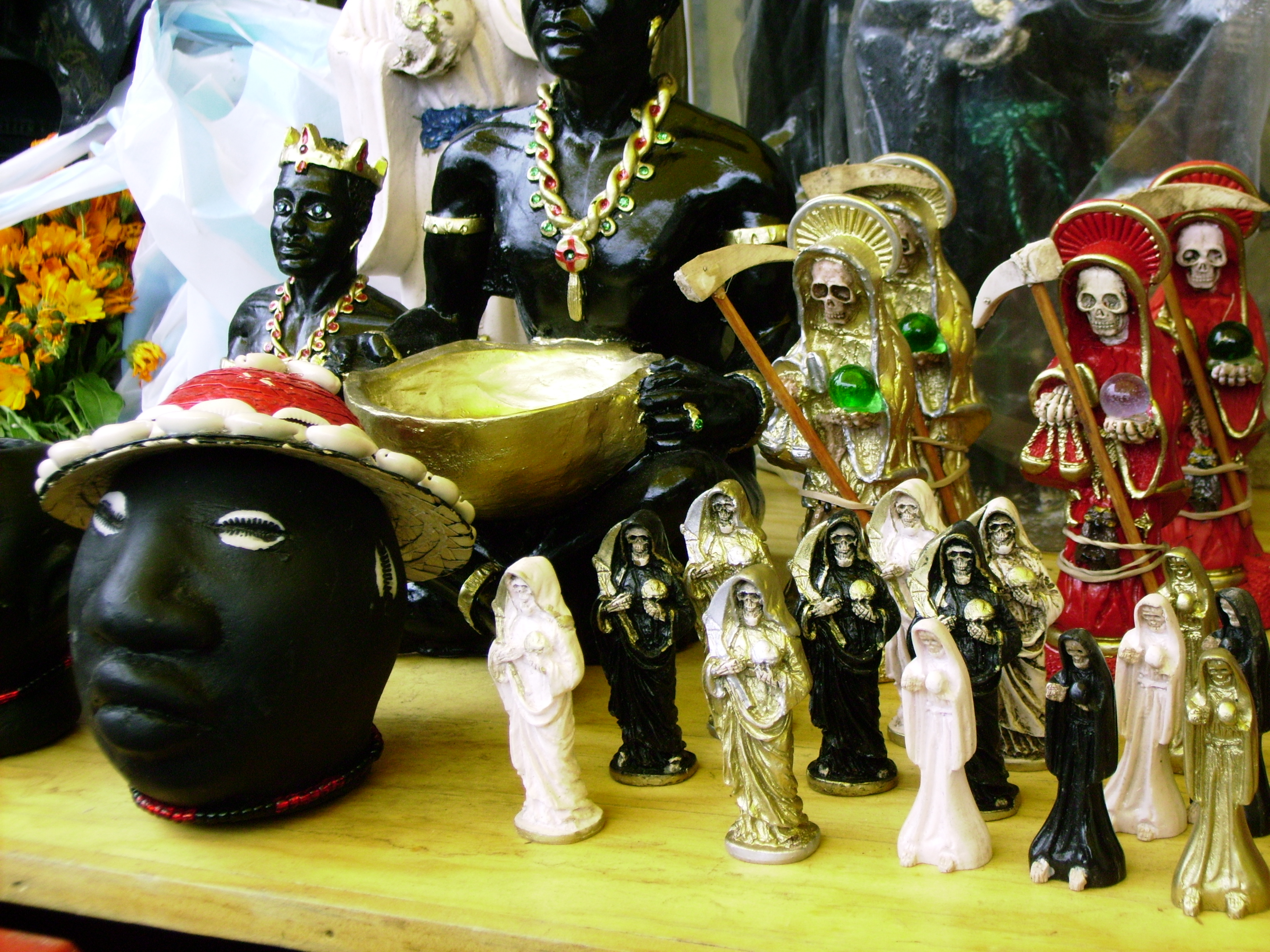
Figurines of Santa Muerte for sale in Sonora Market, Mexico City

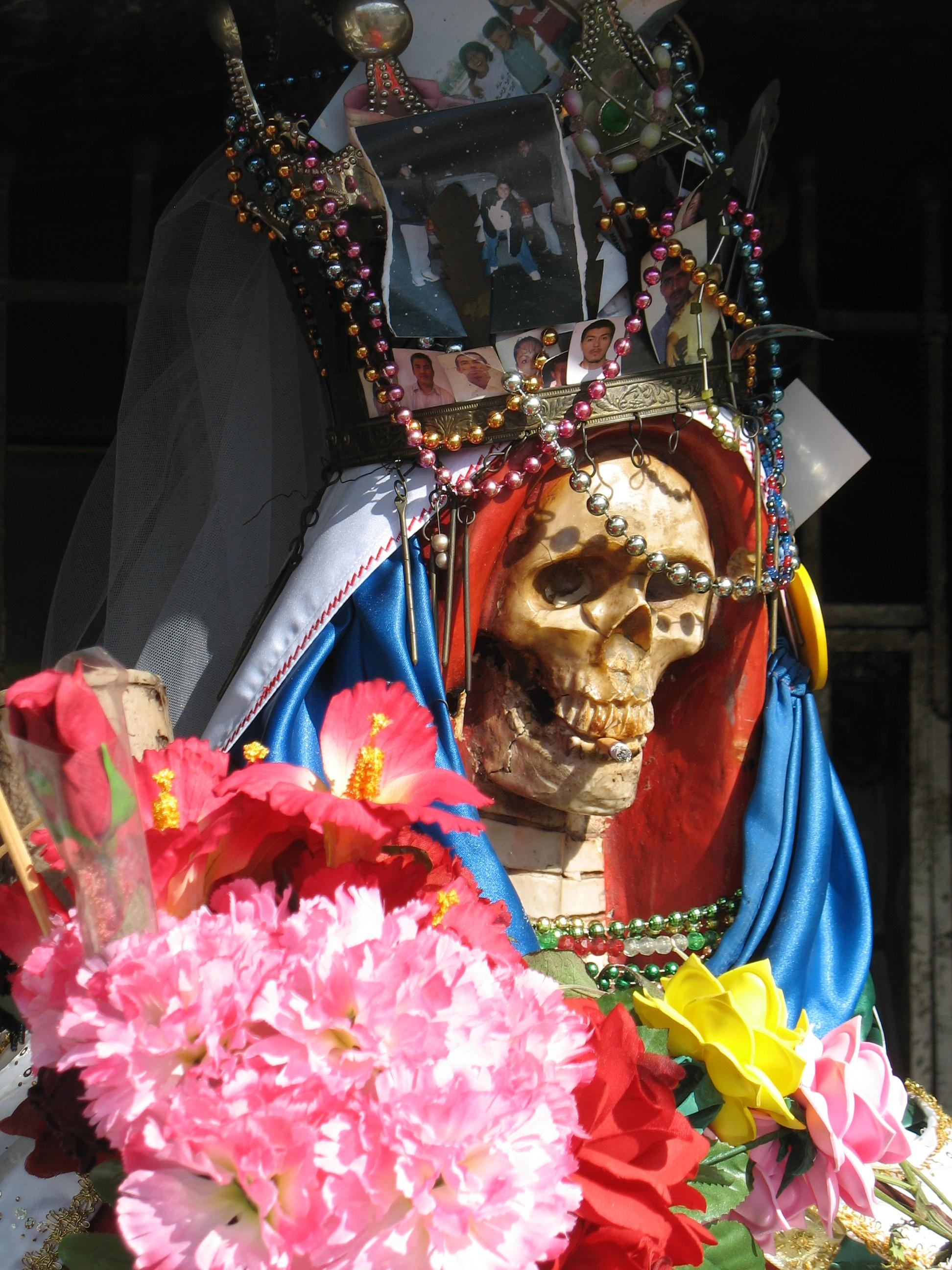
Close-up view of a Santa Muerte statue, Nuevo Laredo, Mexico

Rituals dedicated to Santa Muerte include processions and prayers with the aim of having a miracle granted. Some believers of Santa Muerte remain members of the Catholic Church, while others are cutting ties with the Catholic Church and founding independent Santa Muerte churches and temples. Santa Muerte altars generally contain one or multiple images of the saint, generally surrounded by any or all of the following: cigarettes, flowers, fruit, incense, water, alcoholic beverages, coins, candies and candles. Tobacco is also used for personal cleansing and for cleansing statues of Santa Muerte.

According to popular belief, Santa Muerte is very powerful and is reputed to grant many miracles. Her images are treated as holy and can grant miracles in return for the faith of the believer. As Señora de la Noche ("Lady of the Night"), she is often invoked by those exposed to the dangers of working at night, such as taxi drivers, bar owners, police, soldiers, and sex workers. As such, devotees believe she can protect against assaults, accidents, gun violence, and all types of violent death.

Her effigies are dressed differently depending on what is being requested. Usually, her vestments are differently colored robes, but it is also common for the effigies to be dressed as a bride (for those seeking a husband) or in European medieval nun's garments similar to female Catholic saints. The colors of Santa Muerte's votive candles and vestments are associated with the type of petitions made.

White is the most common color and symbolizes gratitude, purity, or the cleansing of negative influences. Red is for love, lust and passion. It can also signify emotional stability. The color gold signifies economic power, success, money, and prosperity. Green symbolizes justice, legal matters, or unity with loved ones. Amber or dark yellow indicates health. Images with this color can be seen in rehabilitation centers, especially those for drug addiction and alcoholism. Black represents total protection against black magic or sorcery, or conversely negative magic or for force directed against rivals and enemies. Blue candles and images of the saint indicate wisdom, which is favored by students and those in education. Brown is used to invoke spirits from beyond while purple, like yellow, usually symbolizes health. More recently black, purple, yellow and white candles have been used by devotees to supplicate Santa Muerte for healing of and protection from coronavirus as documented by Kingsbury and Chesnut, the leading researchers on Santa Muerte. Other more recent colors include silver, transparent and red with black gown Santa Muerte which are used for particular petitions.

Devotees may present her with a polychrome seven-color candle, which Chesnut believed was adopted from the seven powers candle of Santería, a syncretic Afro-Cuban faith brought to Mexico by Cuban migrants. Here the seven colors are gold, silver, copper, blue, purple, red, and green. In addition to the candles and vestments, each devotee adorns their own image in their own way, using U.S. dollars, gold coins, jewelry, and other items.

Santa Muerte has no official annual feast day but November 2, Day of the Dead, appears to be becoming the favored date. Many larger shrines and temples hold annual celebrations on the date of their founding. The most prominent is November 1, when the believer Enriqueta Romero celebrates her at her historic Tepito shrine where the famous effigy is dressed as a bride. Others celebrate her day on August 15.

Santa Muerte devotion also overlaps with traditions of brujería (witchcraft) and folk magic in Mexico. Some practitioners incorporate Santa Muerte into rituals involving protection, love, healing, cleansing, divination, and the resolution of conflicts, drawing on a wider repertoire of Mexican magical practices. In this context, Santa Muerte may be approached not only as a saint to whom prayers and petitions are directed, but also as a powerful supernatural figure within ritual work.

=== Places of worship ===
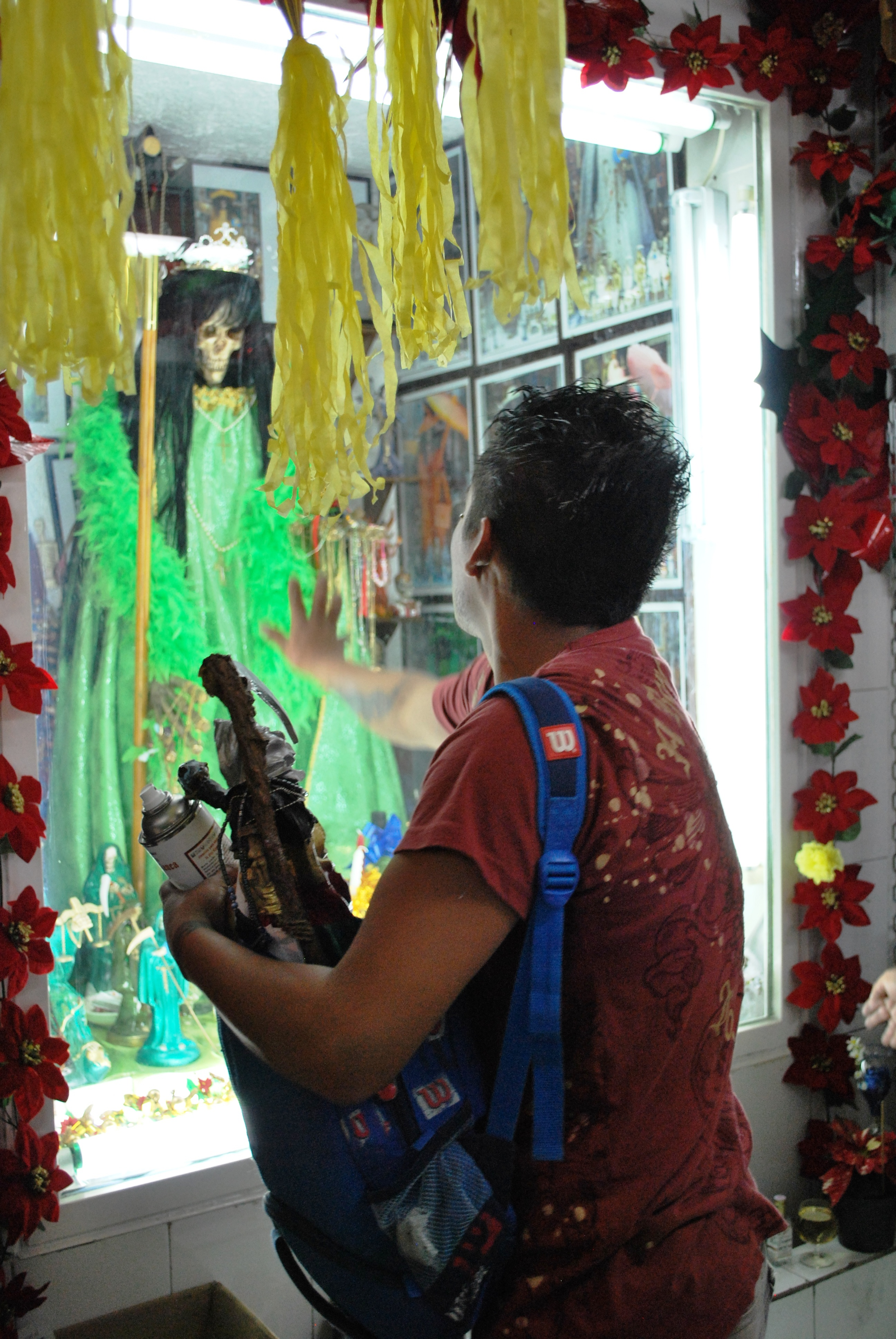
A believer touching the glass of the first public shrine to Santa Muerte, Tepito, Mexico City

According to Chesnut, the new religious movement of Santa Muerte is "generally informal and unorganized". Since worship of this folk saint has been, and to a large extent still is, clandestine, most rituals are performed at altars in the homes of devotees. Recently public shrines have been mushrooming across Mexico. The one on Dr. Vertiz Street in Colonia Doctores is unique in Mexico City because it features statues of Jesús Malverde and Saint Jude along with Santa Muerte. Another public shrine is in a small park on Matamoros Street very close to Paseo de la Reforma.

Shrines can also be found in the back of all kinds of stores and gas stations. As veneration of Santa Muerte becomes more accepted, stores specializing in religious articles, such as botánicas, are carrying more and more paraphernalia related to her worship. Historian R. Andrew Chesnut has discovered that many botanicas in both Mexico and the U.S. are kept in business by sales of Santa Muerte paraphernalia, with numerous shops earning up to half of their profits on Santa Muerte items. This is true even of stores in very well known locations such as Pasaje Catedral behind the Mexico City Cathedral, which is mostly dedicated to stores selling Catholic liturgical items. Her image is a staple in esoterica shops.

There are those who now call themselves Santa Muerte priests or priestesses, such as Jackeline Rodríguez in Monterrey. She maintains a shop in Mercado Juárez in Monterrey, where tarot readers, curanderos, herbal healers, and sorcerers can also be found.

==== Shrine of the Most Holy Death ====
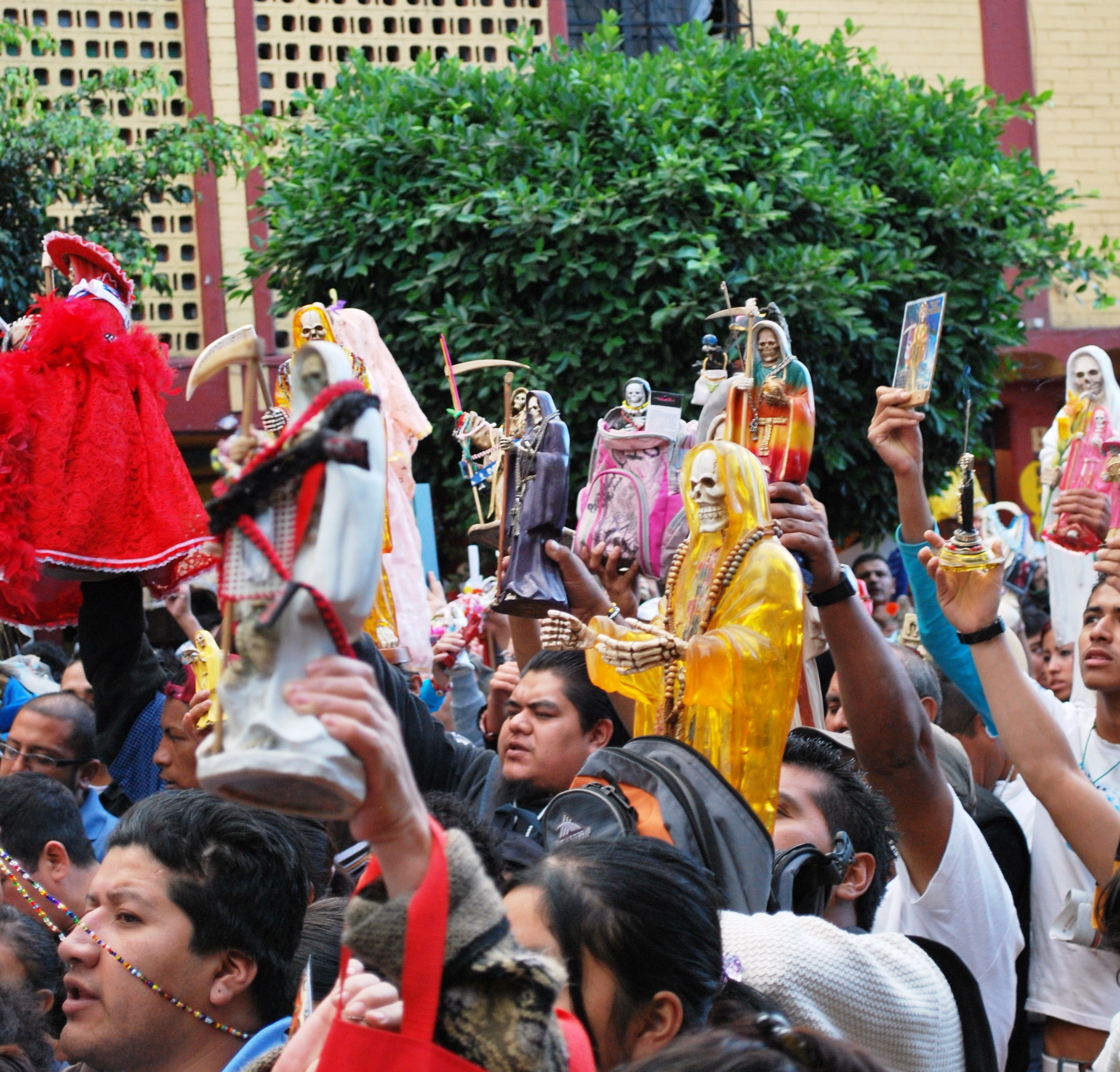
The raising of Santa Muerte images during a service for Santa Muerte in Tepito, Mexico City

The establishment of the first public shrine to the image began to change how Santa Muerte was venerated. The veneration has grown rapidly since then, and others have put their images on public display, as well. In 2001, Enriqueta Romero built a shrine for a life-sized statue of Santa Muerte in her home in Mexico City, visible from the street. The shrine does not hold Catholic masses or occult rites, but people come here to pray and to leave offerings to the image. The effigy is dressed in garbs of different colors depending on the season, with the Romero family changing the dress every first Monday of the month. This statue of the saint features large quantities of jewelry on her neck and arms, which are pinned to her clothing. It is surrounded by offerings left to it, including: flowers, fruits (especially apples), candles, toys, money, notes of thanks for prayers granted, cigarettes, and alcoholic beverages that surround it.

Enriqueta Romero considers herself the chaplain of the shrine, a role she says she inherited from her aunt, who began the practice in the family in 1962. The shrine is located on 12 Alfarería Street in Tepito, Colonia Morelos. For many, this Santa Muerte is the patroness saint of Tepito. The house also contains a shop that sells amulets, bracelets, medallions, books, images, and other items; the most popular item sold there is votive candles.

On the first day of every month Enriqueta Romero or one of her assistants lead prayers and the recitation of the Santa Muerte rosary, which lasts for about an hour and is based on the Catholic rosary. On the first of November the anniversary of the Tepito Santa Muerte shrine erected by Enriqueta Romero is celebrated. This Santa Muerte is dressed as a bride and wears hundreds of pieces of gold jewelry given by the faithful to show gratitude for miracles granted, or to ask for one.

The celebration officially begins at the stroke of midnight of November 1. Thousands of faithful turn out to pray the rosary. For purification, marijuana smoke is used instead of incense, which is traditionally used for purification by Catholics. Food such as cake, chicken with mole, hot chocolate, coffee, and atole are served during the celebrations, which features performances by mariachis and marimba bands.

=== Votive candles ===
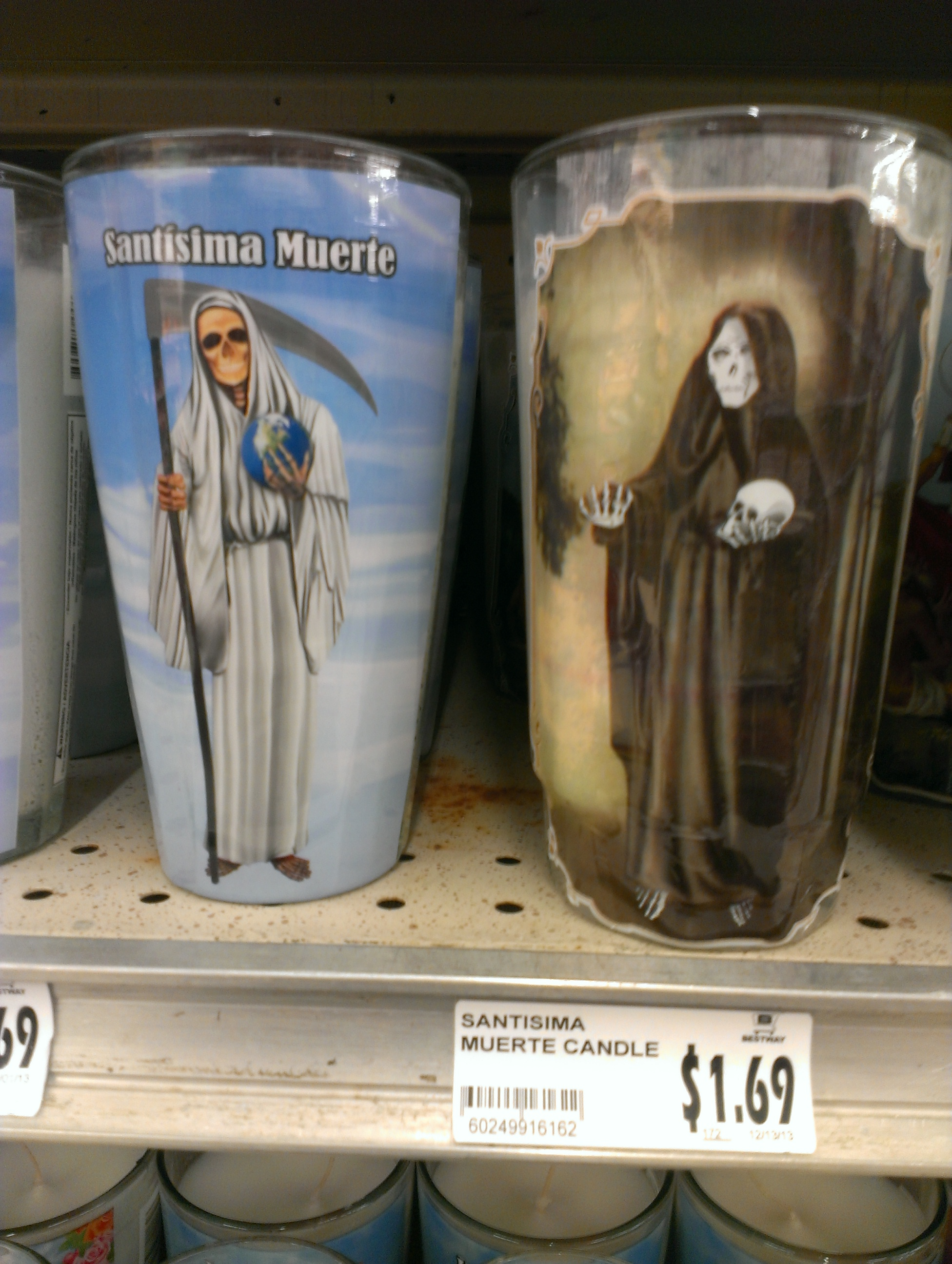
Santa Muerte votive candles at a grocery store in suburban Washington, D.C.

Santa Muerte is a multifaceted saint, with various symbolic meanings and her devotees can call upon her for a wide range of reasons. In herbal shops and markets one can find a plethora of Santa Muerte paraphernalia like the votive candles that have her image on the front and in a color representative of its purpose. On the back of the candles are prayers associated with the color's meaning and may sometimes come with additional prayer cards. Color symbolism is central to devotion and ritual. There are three main colors associated with Santa Muerte: red, white, and black.

The candles are placed on altars and devotees turn to specific colored candles depending on their circumstance. Some keep the full range of colored candles while others focus on one aspect of Santa Muerte's spirit. Santa Muerte is called upon for matters of the heart, health, money, wisdom, and justice. There is the brown candle of wisdom, the white candle of gratitude and consecration, the black candle for protection and vengeance, the red candle of love, lust and passion, the gold candle for monetary affairs, the green candle for crime and justice, the purple candle for healing.

The black votive candle is lit for prayer in order to invoke La Flaca's protection and vengeance. It is associated with "black magic" and witchcraft. It is not regularly seen at devotional sites, and is usually kept and lit in the privacy of one's home. To avert from calling upon official Catholic saints for illegal purposes, some drug traffickers will light Santa Muerte's black candle to ensure protection of shipments of drugs across the border. Nevertheless, black candles may also be used for more benign activities such as reversing spells, as well as all forms of protection and removing energetic blockages.

Black candles are presented to Santa Muerte's altars that drug traffickers used to ensure protection from violence of rival gangs as well as ensure harm to their enemies in gangs and law enforcement. As the drug war in Mexico has escalated, Santa Muerte's veneration by drug bosses has increased and her image is seen again and again in various drug houses. Ironically, the military and police officers that are employed to dismantle the White Lady's shrines make up a large portion of her devotees. Furthermore, even though her presence in the drug world is becoming routine, the sale of black candles pales in comparison to top selling white, red, and gold candles.

One of Santa Muerte's more popular uses is in matters of the heart. The red candle that symbolizes love, lust, and passion is helpful in various situations having to do with love. Her initial main purpose was in love magic during the colonial era in Mexico, which derived from the love magic being brought over from Spain. The Spanish Grim Reapress fused with the indigenous conceptualizations of death are at the root of La Flaca's existence, in so that the use of love magic in Europe and that of pre-Columbian times that was also merging during colonization may have established the saint as a supernatural love doctor.

The majority of anthropological references to Santa Muerte between the 1940s and 1980s cite her roles as a lover sorceress. The candle can be lit for Santa Muerte to attract a certain lover and ensure their love. In contrast though, the red candle can be prayed to for help in ending a bad relationship in order to start another one. These love miracles require specific rituals to increase their love doctors' power. The rituals require several ingredients including red roses and rose water for passion, binding stick to unite the lovers, cinnamon for prosperity, and several others depending on the specific ritual.

== In the United States ==
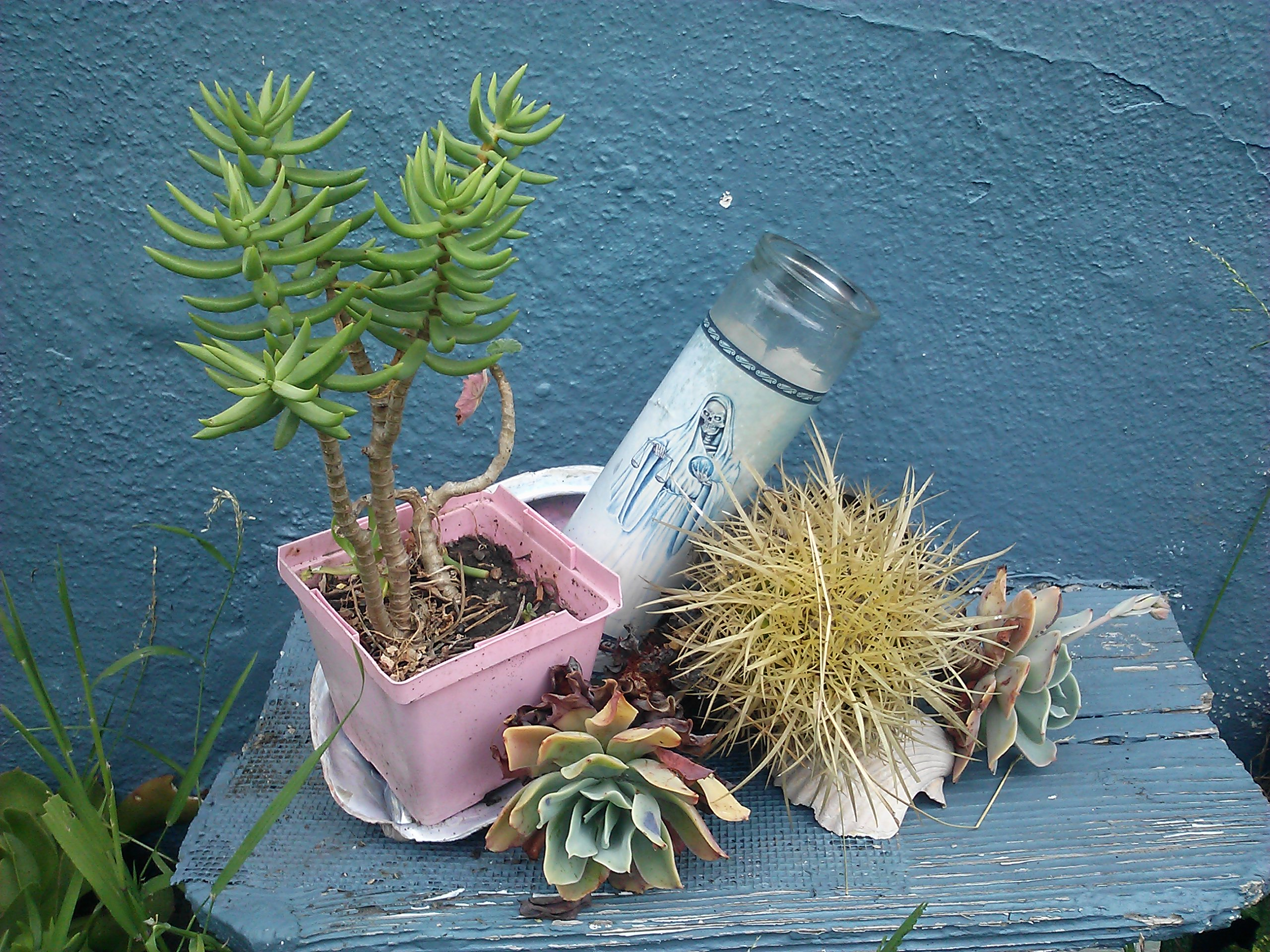
A Santa Muerte garden altar in Richmond in California's San Francisco Bay Area

The new religious movement of Santa Muerte was established in the United States c. 2005, brought to the country by Mexican and Central American immigrants. American scholar of religious studies Andrew Chesnut suggests that there were tens of thousands of devotees in the U.S. by 2012. Devotion to Santa Muerte is primarily visible in cities with large Mexican and Mexican-American populations, such as New York City, Chicago, Houston, San Antonio, Tucson, and Los Angeles. There are fifteen religious groups dedicated to her in Los Angeles alone, which include the Temple of Santa Muerte on Melrose Avenue in East Hollywood.

In many places across the US her popularity has spread beyond Hispanic communities. For instance, the Santisima Muerte Chapel of Perpetual Pilgrimage is maintained by a woman of Danish descent, while the New Orleans Chapel of the Santisima Muerte was founded in 2012 by a Non-Hispanic White devotee.

As in Mexico, some elements of the Catholic Church in the United States are trying to combat Santa Muerte worship, especially in Texas, New Mexico, and Chicago particularly. Compared to the Catholic Church in Mexico, the official reaction in the U.S. is muted. The U.S. Conference of Catholic Bishops has not issued an official position on this, the fastest growing new religious movement in the country and in the entire world. Opposition to the veneration of Santa Muerte in the United States is associated with at least one episode of violence, which occurred on January 2013, when one or more vandals smashed a statue of the folk saint, which had appeared in the San Benito, Texas, municipal cemetery earlier that month.

== Sociology ==
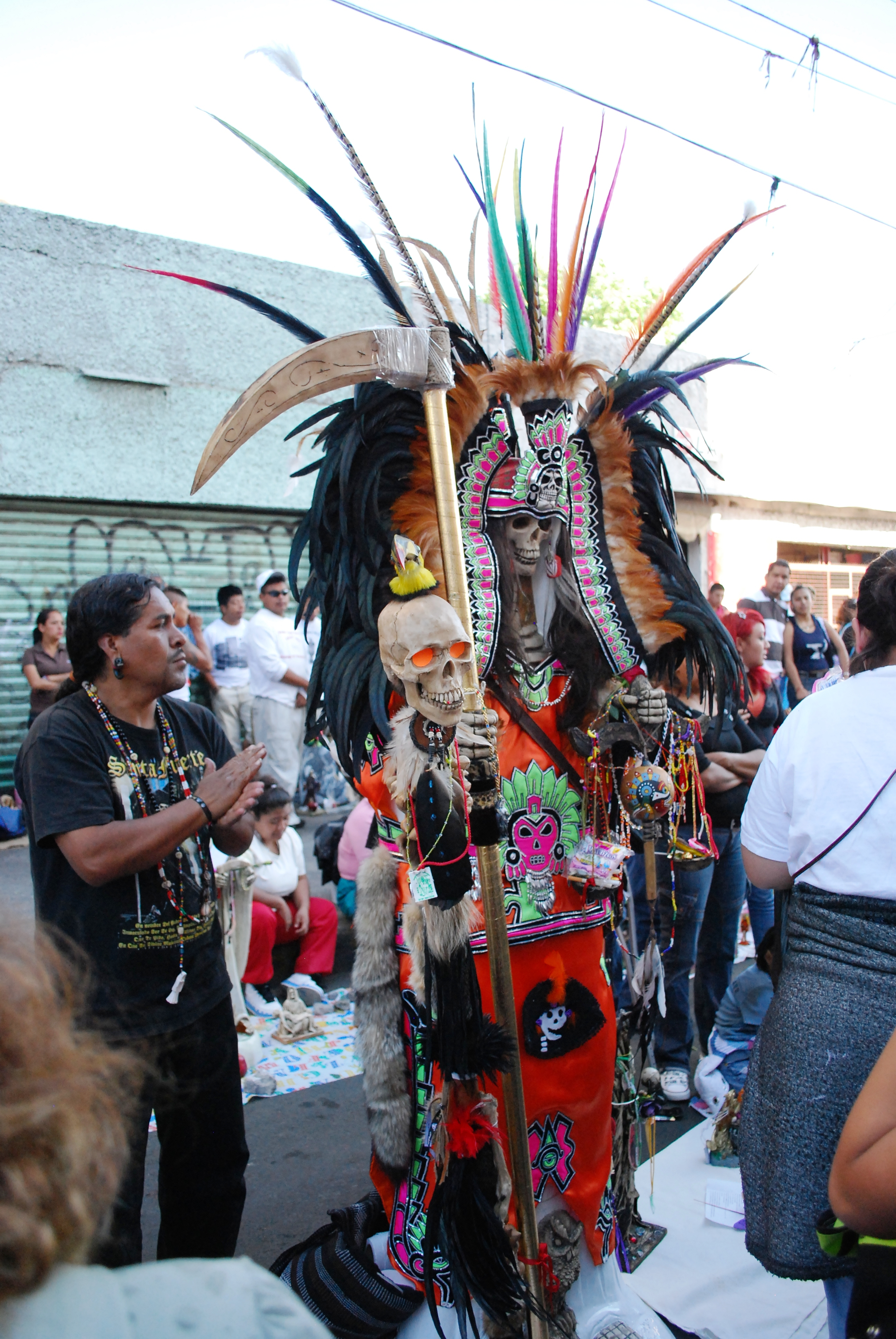
Statue of Santa Muerte in Tepito, Mexico City, displaying the saint's Indigenous Mexican and ancient Aztec characteristics.

The new religious movement of Santa Muerte is present in all social classes of Mexican society, although the majority of devotees are either underemployed workers or from the urban working class. Most are young people, in their teens, twenties, or thirties, and are also mostly female. A large following developed among Mexicans and Hispanic/Latino Americans who are disillusioned with the dominant, institutional Catholic Church and, in particular, with the inability of established Catholic saints to deliver them from poverty, corruption, and violence.

Devotion is based mostly among people with scarce resources, excluded from the formal market economy, as well as the judicial and educational systems, primarily in the inner cities and the very rural areas. Devotion to Santa Muerte is viewed as a "cult of crisis" by some scholars. Devotion to the skeleton saint has expanded rapidly during economic and social hardships, which tend to affect the working classes more. Santa Muerte tends to attract those in extremely difficult or hopeless situations, but also appeals to smaller sectors of middle class professionals and even the affluent. Some of her most devoted followers are those who commit petty crimes, often committed out of desperation, such as sex workers, pickpockets, and thieves.

The worship of Santa Muerte also attracts those who are not inclined to seek the traditional Catholic Church for spiritual solace nor guidance, as it is part of the Mexican establishment; many followers of Santa Muerte live on the margins of civil society or outside of it entirely. Many street vendors, taxi drivers, vendors of counterfeit merchandise, sex workers, pickpockets, drug traffickers, and gang members who follow the Mexican folk saint are not practicing Roman Catholics or Protestants. In essence, they have created their own new religious movement that reflects their realities, hardships, identity, and practices, especially since it speaks to the violence and struggles for life that many of these people face. Conversely, both police forces and the military in Mexico can be counted among the faithful who ask for blessings on their weapons and ammunition.

While worship is largely based in poor neighborhoods, Santa Muerte is also venerated in affluent areas, such as the Condesa and Coyoacán districts of Mexico City. However, negative media coverage of the worship and condemnation by the Catholic Church in Mexico and certain Protestant denominations have influenced public perception of the cult of Santa Muerte. With the exception of some artists and politicians, some of whom perform rituals secretly, those in higher socioeconomic strata look upon the veneration with distaste as a form of superstition.

Santa Muerte's popularity is massive in Mexico, which is home to the majority of her followers. Santa Muerte has been viewed as either the saint of death and/or the saint of healing, with both sides being integrated with her practices. Many of her followers believe that, with enough worship and prayer, there have been links to healing, protection, and love if Santa Muerte is satisfied with them.

=== Association with the LGBTQ+ community ===
Santa Muerte is also revered and seen as a saint and protector of the lesbian, gay, bisexual, transgender, and queer (LGBTQ+) communities in Mexico. Many LGBTQ+ people ask her for protection from violence, hatred, diseases, and to help them in their search for love. Her intercession is commonly invoked in same-sex marriage ceremonies performed in Mexico. The now-defunct Traditionalist Mexican-American Catholic Church, an independent Catholic denomination devoted to the worship of Santa Muerte, recognized gay marriages and performed religious wedding ceremonies for same sex couples.

Santa Muerte has continued to see an increase in worship by members of the LGBTQ+ community throughout the United States and Mexico, where many have developed an identity with queerness in association with Santa Muerte, with rallies being held in Queens, New York.

=== Association with criminality ===
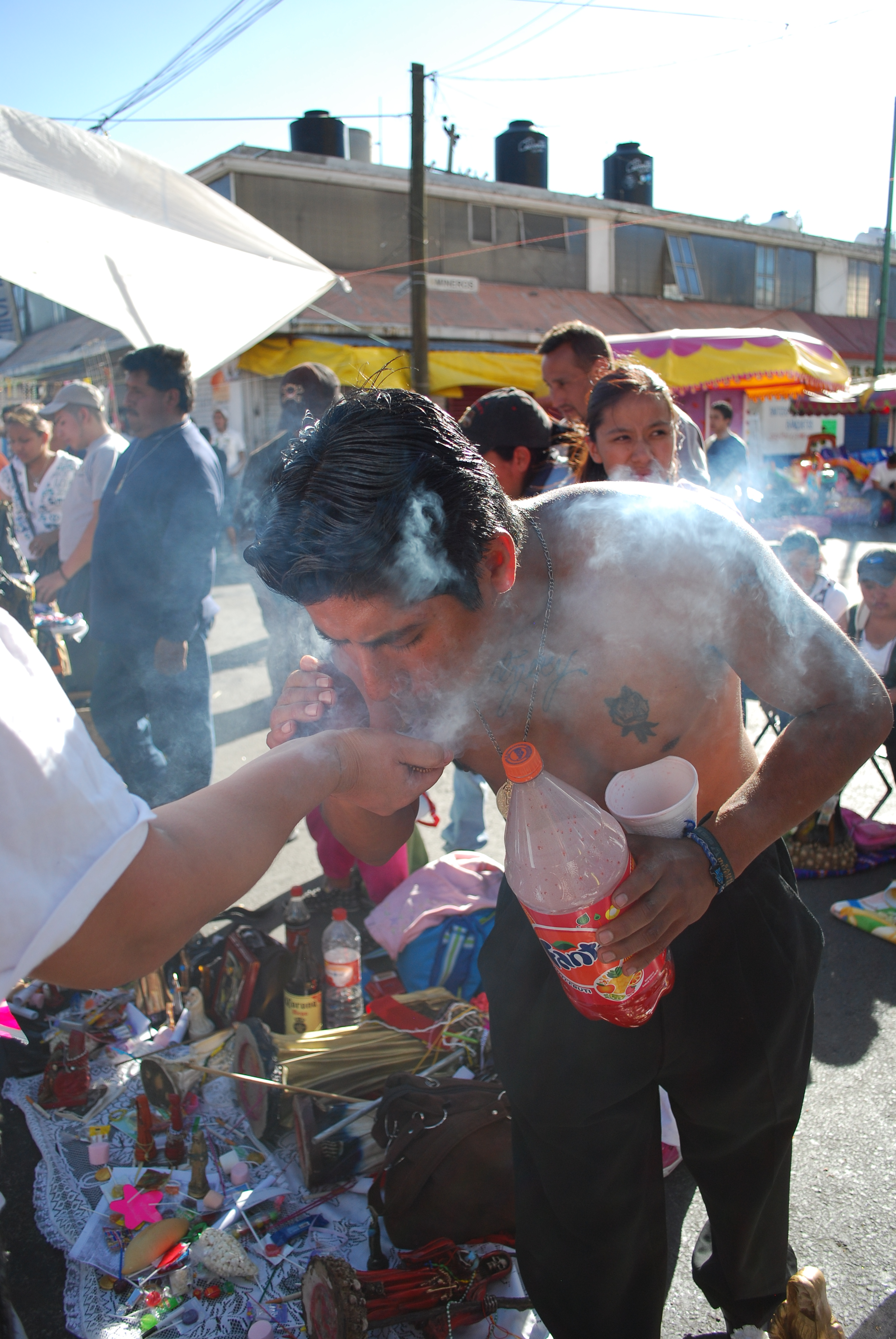
A man blowing smoke onto a miniature image of Santa Muerte

Santa Muerte's association with criminal activities and organizations has a long history throughout Mexico and the United States. Santa Muerte's resemblance to the Grim Reaper has generated controversy around whether she should be worshipped or frowned upon, with national Catholic Churches and dioceses having regarded the followers of Santa Muerte as devil-worshippers. Mexican authorities have linked Santa Muerte's devotees with prostitution, drugs, kidnappings, and homicides after police have found shrines and figures of the death saint in many incidents. In the Mexican and U.S. press, devotion to Santa Muerte is often associated with violent crimes, organized crime, kidnappings, extortions, prostitution, and the illegal drug trade. She is a popular religious figure in prisons, both among inmates and staff, and shrines dedicated to her can be found in many cells.

Altars with images of Santa Muerte have been found in many drug houses, both in Mexico and the United States. Among Santa Muerte's more infamous devotees are kidnapper Daniel Arizmendi López, known as El Mochaorejas, and Gilberto García Mena, one of the bosses of the Gulf Cartel. In March 2012, the Sonora State Investigative Police announced that they had arrested eight people for murder for allegedly having performed a human sacrifice of a woman and two ten-year-old boys to Santa Muerte. In 2025, shrines and altars dedicated to Santa Muerte were discovered in Iztapalapa when the Secretariat of Citizen Security and Attorney Office launched a search in the Colonia Renovacion and arrested three people who had doses of drugs and altars of Santa Muerte.

Ritual killings in Mexico, seemingly inspired by or associated with Santa Muerte, have occurred during the height of the Felipe Calderón presidency, with his declaration of war against the drug cartels and criminal gangs in Mexico after his inauguration in December 2006. Silvia Meraz, a Mexican serial killer and cult leader, was convicted of three murders which took place between 2009 and 2012 in Nacozari, Sonora; the victims were murdered as human sacrifices to Santa Muerte. In November 2024, a local religious leader devoted to Santa Muerte was gunned down at an altar dedicated to the skeleton figure.

In December 2010 David Romo Guillén, founder and archbishop of the Traditionalist Mexican-American Catholic Church, an independent Catholic denomination devoted to the worship of Santa Muerte, was arrested by Mexican authorities on charges of managing the funds of a kidnapping gang linked to a Mexican drug cartel and sentenced to 66 years in prison for kidnapping and extortion, and the church was stripped of legal recognition on similar grounds in 2006. Mexican drug lords, like those of La Familia Michoacana cartel, take advantage of the vulnerability of their "gangster footsoldiers" and enforced religious obedience to establish a sacred meaning to their cause that would keep their soldiers disciplined.

== Media and material circulation ==
Santa Muerte is addressed as and known under multiple social adaptations, as digital and material culture play a part in circulating and sharing Santa Muerte as an intermediary. Digital ethnography on the folk saint displays a correlation for increased devotion, as devotees create specialized online communities across various platforms as a means of spreading her agenda and services they formulate, such as healing, interventions, and "miracles". Major issues regarding health, such as COVID, also act as catalysts for media coverage, in turn, feeding the functionality of Santa Muerte as an outlet for faith. Mediums, methods, and manner of circulation also vary across regions, with differing perspectives in the borderlands of Texas, the region along the Rio Grande, the U.S/Mexico border.

=== Online culture ===
News on Santa Muerte per the figure's criminal association primarily originates from journalistic mediums, both written and visual, ranging from newspapers and websites to films and documentaries. Information spaces discussing Santa Muerte on the Internet vary widely, with published websites, articles, and blogs framing around her violent and occult relations. The folk saint's perceptions across demographics relies on mass, mainstream media formats as a political and theological subject.

Borderlands media, media reflecting intersectionality in the cultures and identities along the U.S/Mexico border, continues Santa Muerte's criminal relations. Texas as a metaphysical cultural space where living identity is defined beyond location into akin experience and perception generates folk creation and publicity. U.S media print continues to depict and affiliate the war on drugs with folk saints like Santa Muerte. TV and news commercialize this correlation, while social media and harmful "fake news" popularize the phenomena via search term usage trends.

=== Social ethnography ===
Social media is an influential outlet for Santa Muerte's emergence. Santa Muertistas, a specialized term for devotees of the saint, with demographics primarily female, are spreading the saints' agenda(s) via networking, posts and promotional speech. Interaction in these online spaces builds a community where members are allowed active leading roles in distributing information and catering to the needs of each other. This prestigious takeaway motivates social and spiritual development, where added involvement adds to the gendered appeal.

Widespread issues relating to health, such as COVID-19, have led to depictions of Santa Muerte's services across media platforms, with a concentration on Facebook. Santa Muertistas used the platform and dedicated it to instant and digital prayer and healing. The digital community consistently posted virtual offerings, such as healing narratives and visuals, for Santa Muerte with intentions of rebuking the virus.

=== Material culture ===
Markets are convenient spaces for material trade and transactions and hot spots for relics of worship. Juarez market in Monterrey, and others across Mexico, often sell items affiliated with religious faith and ritualistic devotion. Household items, statues, designs, and crafts are popular amongst commercial production, as they can be flexibly incorporated into homes, allowing diversity and personalization for devoted consumers.

== Opposition and persecution ==
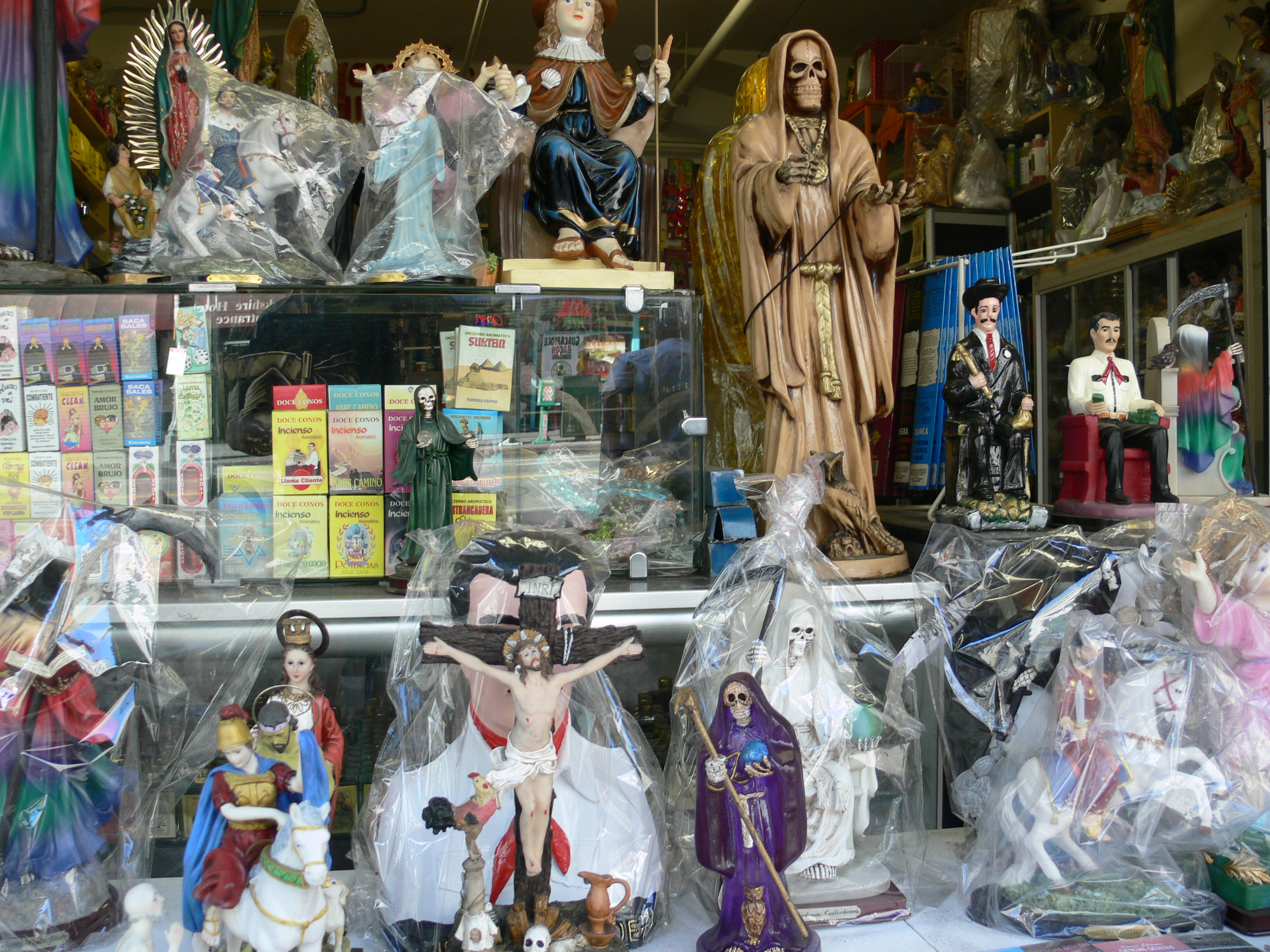
Santa Muerte statues alongside other items of Mexican Catholic veneration (Jesus Christ, Virgin Mary), and Jesús Malverde on sale at a shop on Broadway in Downtown Los Angeles, California, United States

Since the mid-20th century and throughout the 21st century, the new religious movement of Santa Muerte and her devotees have been regularly discriminated, ostracized, and socially excluded both by the Roman Catholic Church and various Protestant groups in Mexico and the rest of Central America.

The Catholic Church has condemned devotion to Santa Muerte in Mexico and Latin America as blasphemous and satanic, calling it a "degeneration of religion". When Pope Francis visited Mexico in 2016, he repudiated Santa Muerte on his first full day in the country, condemning Santa Muerte as a dangerous symbol of narco-culture; Santa Muerte has been defined by some news outlets as a "narco-saint".

Evangelical Protestant denominations in Mexico and Latin America have condemned it too, as black magic and trickery. The Catholic Church in Mexico has accused Santa Muerte devotees—many of whom were baptized in the Catholic religion despite the difference of belief and the fact that Santa Muerte churches and temples have instituted a separate baptism practice—of having turned to devil-worship. Roman Catholic priests regularly chastise parishioners, telling them that death is not a person but rather a phase of life. However, the Roman Catholic Church stops short of labeling such followers as heretics, instead accusing them of heterodoxy. The Mexican Catholic Church has also officially condemned the worship of Santa Muerte because most of her rites are modeled after Catholic liturgy, and some Santa Muerte devotees eventually split from the Catholic Church and began vying for control of church buildings.

The federal government of Mexico has attempted to remove Santa Muerte's influence among the people and to stop its spread throughout the country and across the border to the United States. In a controversial fashion, the Mexican government bulldozed nearly forty shrines throughout the U.S.–Mexican border, as according to the military, Santa Muerte has been integrated with narco-culture.

Despite many attempts by the Catholic Church and Protestant churches to undermine the devotion to Santa Muerte in Mexico and elsewhere, and religious discrimination and accusations towards her followers, the new religious movement of Santa Muerte has enjoyed meteoric growth and spread across the American continent since the early 2000s, and is considered by academic expert Andrew Chesnut to be the single fastest-growing new religious movement in the world.

== See also ==
- Bodhisattva
- European colonization of the Americas
  - Catholic Church and the Age of Discovery
  - Slavery in colonial Spanish America
  - Spanish colonization of the Americas
- Guardian angel
- Heresy in Christianity
  - Heresy in the Catholic Church
  - List of Christian heresies
- List of death deities
  - Azrael
  - Baron Samedi
  - Destroying angel (Bible)
  - Thanatos
- Maximón
- Michael (archangel)
  - Saint Michael in the Catholic Church
- Mesoamerica
  - Aztec Empire
  - Maya civilization
  - Pre-Columbian era
- Personifications of death
- Psychopomp
- Recreational drug use
- Skeleton (undead)
- Skull art
- Veneration of Judas Thaddaeus in Mexico

== Sources ==
=== Academic books ===
- Chesnut, R. Andrew, Devoted to Death: Santa Muerte, the Skeleton Saint (3rd edition), Oxford University Press, 2025.
- Chesnut, R. Andrew, Santa Muerte: El Movimiento Religioso de Más Rápido Crecimiento en el Mundo, Amazon, 2023.
- Hernández Hernández, Alberto, La Santa Muerte: espacios, cultos y devociones, El Colegio de la Frontera Norte, 2017.
- Pansters, Wil G., La Santa Muerte in Mexico: History, Devotion, and Society, University of New Mexico Press, 2019.
- Yllescas, Jorge Adrián, Ver, oír y callar. Creer en la Santa Muerte durante el encierro, UNAM, 2018.

=== Academic journals ===
- Bastante, Pamela; Dickieson, Brenton (Winter 2013). "Nuestra Señora de las Sombras: The Enigmatic Identity of Santa Muerte". Journal of the Southwest. 55 (4). Tucson: Southwest Center at the University of Arizona: 435–471. doi:10.1353/JSW.2013.0010. ISSN 2158-1371. JSTOR 24394940. S2CID 110098311.
- Bromley, David G. (June 2016). Chesnut, R. Andrew; Metcalfe, David (eds.). "Santa Muerte as Emerging Dangerous Religion?". Religions. 7 (6: Death in the New World: The Rise of Santa Muerte). Basel: MDPI: 65. doi:10.3390/rel7060065. eISSN 2077-1444.
- Gaytán Alcalá, Felipe (January–June 2008). "Santa entre los Malditos: Culto a La Santa Muerte en el México del siglo XXI". LiminaR: Estudios Sociales y Humanísticos (in Spanish). 6 (1). Tuxtla Gutiérrez: Centro de Estudios Superiores de México y Centroamérica (CESMECA) – Universidad de Ciencias y Artes de Chiapas: 40–51. doi:10.29043/liminar.v6i1.265. eISSN 2007-8900. ISSN 1665-8027. S2CID 142525950.
- González, César R. (2019). "La Santa Muerte: symbole et dévotion envers "la reine des épouvantables"/Santa Muerte: Symbolism and devotion to the "Lady of Holy Death"". Sociétés (in French). 4 (146). Paris: De Boeck Supérieur: 91–103. doi:10.3917/soc.146.0091. ISSN 0765-3697. S2CID 213290072 – via Cairn.info.
- Higuera-Bonfil, Antonio (July–December 2015). "Fiestas en honor a la Santa Muerte en el Caribe mexicano". LiminaR: Estudios Sociales y Humanísticos (in Spanish). 13 (2). Tuxtla Gutiérrez: Centro de Estudios Superiores de México y Centroamérica (CESMECA) – Universidad de Ciencias y Artes de Chiapas: 96–109. doi:10.29043/liminar.v13I2.395. eISSN 2007-8900. ISSN 1665-8027. S2CID 143369628.
- Kingsbury, Kate; Chesnut, R. Andrew (March 2021). Oleszkiewicz-Peralba, Małgorzata (ed.). "Syncretic Santa Muerte: Holy Death and Religious Bricolage". Religions. 12 (3: Syncretism and Liminality in Latin American and Latinx Religions). Basel: MDPI: 220. doi:10.3390/rel12030220. eISSN 2077-1444.
- Kingsbury, Kate; Chesnut, R. Andrew (December 2020). Boudreault-Fournier, Alexandrine (ed.). "Santa Muerte: Sainte Matronne de l'Amour et de la Mort". Anthropologica. 62 (2). University of Toronto Press: 380–393. doi:10.3138/anth-2019-0004 (inactive 12 July 2025). ISSN 2292-3586. LCCN 56004160. OCLC 610393076. S2CID 231625165.
- Kingsbury, Kate; Chesnut, R. Andrew (September 2020a). Usarski, Frank (ed.). "Holy Death in the Time of Coronavirus: Santa Muerte, the Salubrious Saint". International Journal of Latin American Religions. 4 (1). Berlin: Springer Nature: 194–217. doi:10.1007/s41603-020-00110-6. eISSN 2509-9965. ISSN 2509-9957. PMC 7485595. S2CID 221656092.
- Kingsbury, Kate (July 2020). Usarski, Frank (ed.). "Death is Women's Work: Santa Muerte, a Folk Saint and Her Female Followers". International Journal of Latin American Religions. 4 (1). Berlin: Springer Nature: 43–63. doi:10.1007/s41603-020-00106-2. eISSN 2509-9965. ISSN 2509-9957. S2CID 225572498.
- Kingsbury, Kate; Chesnut, R. Andrew (February 2020). Usarski, Frank (ed.). "Not Just a Narcosaint: Santa Muerte as Matron Saint of the Mexican Drug War". International Journal of Latin American Religions. 4 (1). Berlin: Springer Nature: 25–47. doi:10.1007/s41603-020-00095-2. eISSN 2509-9965. ISSN 2509-9957. S2CID 213417007.
- Kristensen, Regnar A. (February 2015). Jones, Gareth; Macaulay, Fiona; Miller, Rory (eds.). "La Santa Muerte in Mexico City: The Cult and its Ambiguities". Journal of Latin American Studies. 47 (3). Cambridge: Cambridge University Press: 543–566. doi:10.1017/S0022216X15000024. ISSN 1469-767X. LCCN 79008163. OCLC 01800137. S2CID 145524640.
- Kristensen, Regnar A. (August 2014). "How did Death become a Saint in Mexico?". Ethnos: Journal of Anthropology. 81 (3). Taylor & Francis: 402–424. doi:10.1080/00141844.2014.938093. S2CID 143603099.
- Marrero, Roberto Garcés (December 2019). "La Santa Muerte en la Ciudad de México: Devoción, vida cotidiana y espacio público/La Santa Muerte in Mexico City: Devotion, everyday life and public space". Revista Cultura & Religión (in Spanish). 13 (2). Instituto de Estudios Internacionales (Universidad Arturo Prat): 103–121. doi:10.4067/S0718-47272019000200103. ISSN 0718-4727. S2CID 213065454.
- Martin, Desirée A. (March 2017). Chesnut, R. Andrew; Metcalfe, David (eds.). ""Santísima Muerte, Vístete de Negro, Santísima Muerte, Vístete de Blanco": La Santa Muerte's Illegal Marginalizations". Religions. 8 (3). Basel: MDPI: 36. doi:10.3390/rel8030036. eISSN 2077-1444.
- Michalik, Piotr Grzegorz (January–March 2011). "Death with a Bonus Pack: New Age Spirituality, Folk Catholicism, and the Cult of Santa Muerte" (PDF). Archives de sciences sociales des religions. 153 (1). Paris: Éditions de l'EHESS: 159–182. doi:10.4000/assr.22800. ISBN 978-2-71322301-3. ISSN 1777-5825. JSTOR 41336081. S2CID 144847868.
- Perdigón Castañeda, Judith K. (December 2015). "La indumentaria para La Santa Muerte". Cuicuilco: Revista de la Escuela Nacional de Antropología e Historia (in Spanish). 22 (64). Mexico City: Instituto Nacional de Antropología e Historia (CONACULTA): 43–62. ISSN 1405-7778. S2CID 192520236.
- Perdigón Castañeda, Judith K. (January–June 2008). "Una relación simbiótica entre La Santa Muerte y El Niño de las Suertes". LiminaR: Estudios Sociales y Humanísticos (in Spanish). 6 (1). Tuxtla Gutiérrez: Centro de Estudios Superiores de México y Centroamérica (CESMECA) – Universidad de Ciencias y Artes de Chiapas: 52–70. doi:10.29043/liminar.v6i1.266. eISSN 2007-8900. ISSN 1665-8027. S2CID 143388890.
- Reyes-Cortez, Marcel (March 2012). "Material culture, magic, and the Santa Muerte in the cemeteries of a megalopolis". Culture and Religion. 13 (1). Taylor & Francis: 107–131. doi:10.1080/14755610.2012.658420. OCLC 223320203. S2CID 145194760.
- Torres-Ramos, Gabriela (2015). Souffron, Valérie (ed.). "Un culte populaire au Mexique: la Santa Muerte". Socio-anthropologie (in French). 31 (31). Paris: Université Paris 1 Panthéon-Sorbonne: 139–150. doi:10.4000/socio-anthropologie.2228. eISSN 1773-018X. ISBN 978-2-85944-913-1.

=== Monographs, grimoires, and essays ===
- Aridjis, Homero (2017) [2004]. La Santa Muerte/Holy Death. New York: Penguin Random House. ISBN 9786073150736.
- Chesnut, R. Andrew (2025) [2012]. Devoted to Death: Santa Muerte, the Skeleton Saint (3rd ed.). New York: Oxford University Press. doi:10.1093/acprof:oso/9780199764662.001.0001. ISBN 978-0197769133. LCCN 2011009177.
- Chesnut, R. Andrew (26 October 2017). Santa Muerte: The Fastest Growing New Religious Movement in the Americas (Speech). Lecture. Portland, Oregon: University of Portland. Archived from the original on 7 February 2021.
- Flores Martos, Juan A. (2008). "Transformismos y transculturación de un culto novomestizo emergente: La Santa Muerte Mexicana" (PDF). In Cornejo Valle, Mónica; Cantón Delgado, Manuela; Llera Blanes, Ruy (eds.). Teorías y prácticas emergentes en antropología de la religión. XI Congreso de Antropología de la FAAEE (in Spanish). San Sebastián: Ankulegi Antropologia Elkartea. pp. 55–76. ISBN 978-84-691-4962-1.
- Higuera-Bonfil, Antonio (2016). "La religión transterrada. El culto a la Santa Muerte en Nueva York". In Hernández, Alberto Hernández (ed.). La Santa Muerte. Espacios, cultos y devociones (in Spanish). Tijuana: El Colegio de la Frontera Norte/El Colegio de San Luis. pp. 229–251. ISBN 978-607-479-238-6. OCLC 978293392.
- Lorusso, Fabrizio; Evangelisti, Valerio (2013). Santa Muerte. Patrona dell'umanità. Eretica speciale (in Italian). Tarquinia: Stampa Alternativa/Nuovi Equilibri. ISBN 978-8862223300.
- Müller, Silke (2021). "La Santa Muerte" – Leben mit dem Tod. Eine Soziologie der Verehrung. Kulturen der Gesellschaft (in German). Vol. 46. Bielefeld: Transcript Verlag. ISBN 978-3-8376-5513-1.
- Oleszkiewicz-Peralba, Małgorzata (2015). "Santa Muerte, Death the Protector". Fierce Feminine Divinities of Eurasia and Latin America: Baba Yaga, Kālī, Pombagira, and Santa Muerte. New York: Palgrave Macmillan. pp. 103–135. doi:10.1057/9781137535009_5. ISBN 978-1-137-54354-7. S2CID 163422636.
- Pansters, Wil G., ed. (2019). La Santa Muerte in Mexico: History, Devotion, and Society. Albuquerque: University of New Mexico Press. ISBN 978-0-8263-6081-6. OCLC 1105750108. S2CID 211582359.
- Perdigón Castañeda, Judith K.; Sáinz, Luis Ignacio (2008). La Santa Muerte, protectora de los Hombres (in Spanish). Distrito Federal (Mexico): Instituto Nacional de Antropología e Historia (CONACULTA). ISBN 978-968-03-0306-9. OCLC 259744376.
- Velázquez, Eduardo G.; García-Villada, Eduardo; Knepper, Timothy D. (2019). "The Cult of Santa Muerte: Migration, Marginalization, and Medicalization". In Knepper, Timothy D.; Bregman, Lucy; Gottschalk, Mary (eds.). Death and Dying. Comparative Philosophy of Religion. Vol. 2. Heidelberg: Springer Verlag. pp. 63–76. doi:10.1007/978-3-030-19300-3_5. eISSN 2522-0039. ISBN 978-3-030-19299-0. ISSN 2522-0020. S2CID 203054002.
