= Narco-saint =

Saints venerated by criminals

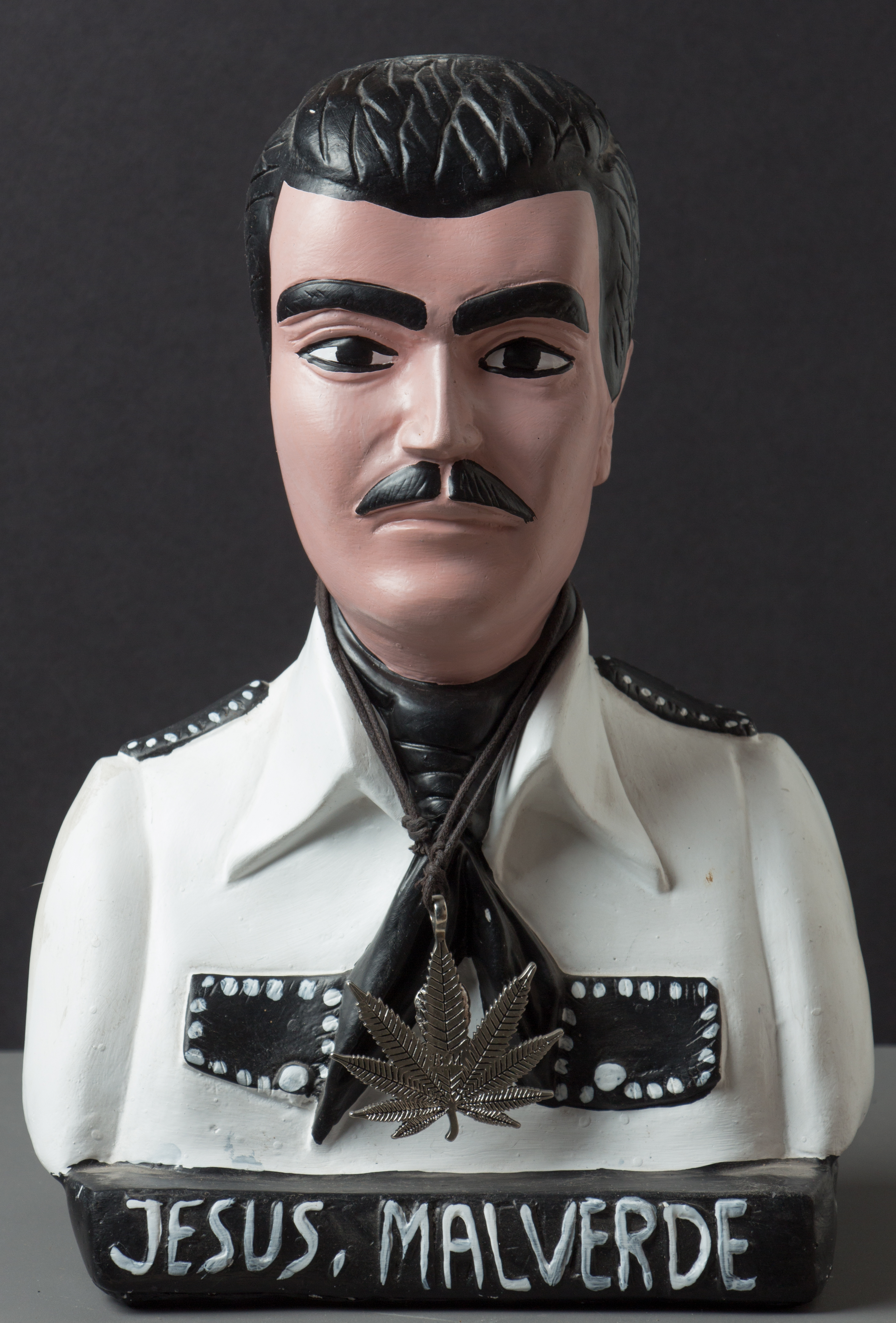
A religious bust of Jesús Malverde, a popular narco-saint, with a marijuana leaf-shaped necklace.

Narco-saints (Spanish: Narcosantos) are folk saints that are venerated (or sometimes worshipped) by criminals such as money launderers, smugglers, and drug traffickers, particularly in the United States and Latin America.

Narco-saints are venerated through means condemned by the Catholic Church, although their rites are a form of folk Catholicism. While they may be venerated by non-criminals, criminal organizations tend to take their religious practices to extremes. In the case of Santa Muerte, some followers are known to commit human sacrifice on behalf of drug cartels. The Drug Enforcement Administration says that narco-saints embolden drug cartels, and make them more dangerous, particularly because drug traffickers are "not afraid of death" if they worship them.

Many drug cartel leaders have attempted to portray themselves as modern folk-heroes, often with religious aspects, creating cults of personality around themselves in their communities. After the deaths of notable drug lords such as Nazario Moreno González and Pablo Escobar, they were seen as narco-saints by followers.

== Notable narco-saints ==
- Holy Infant of Atocha
- Jesús Malverde
- Jude the Apostle
- Maximón
- Nazario Moreno González
- Pablo Escobar
- Raymond Nonnatus
- Santa Muerte
- Sarita Colonia

== See also ==
- Narco-Pentecostalism
- Narcoculture in Mexico
