= Jesús Malverde =

Mexican folk hero (1870–1909)

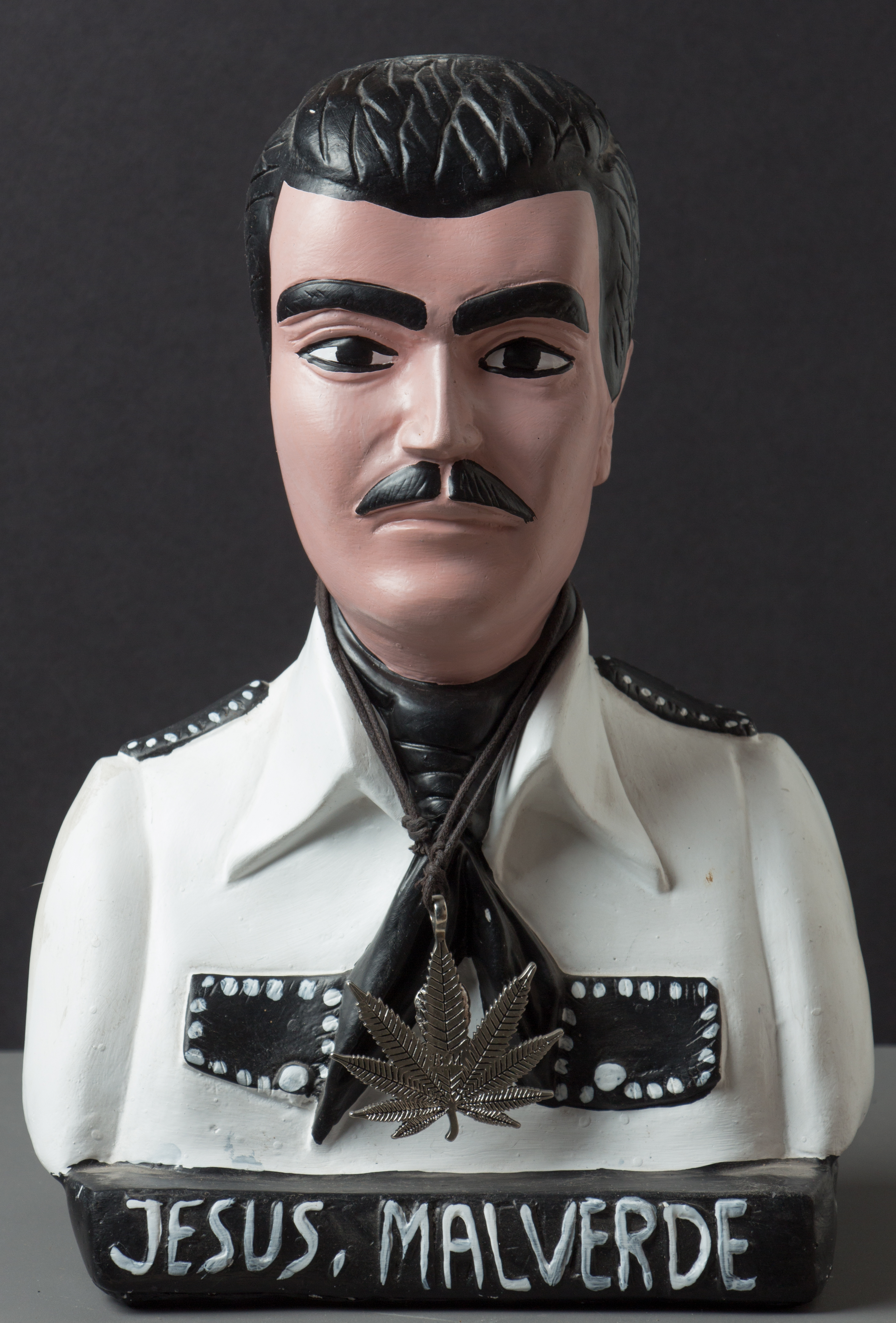
- Jesús Malverde image

Angel of the Poor, Generous Bandit, The Narco Saint
- Born: 24 December 1870; Sinaloa, Mexico
- Died: 3 May 1909 (age 38); Sinaloa, Mexico
- Venerated in: Sinaloa; Folk Catholicism
- Major shrine: Culiacán, Mexico
- Feast: 3 May
- Patronage: Mexican drug cartels, drug trafficking, outlaws, bandits, robbers, thieves, smugglers, people in poverty

Jesús Malverde (pronounced [xeˈsus malˈbeɾde]) born Jesús Juárez Matzo Campos, 24 December 1870 – 3 May 1909), commonly referred to as the "generous bandit", "angel of the poor", or the "narco-saint", was a Mexican bandit and folklore hero in the Mexican state of Sinaloa.

He was of Yoreme and Spanish heritage. He is a "Robin Hood" figure who was supposed to have stolen from the rich to give to the poor. He would steal gold coins from the wealthy residents of Culiacán, throwing his earnings into the doorways belonging to impoverished citizens which eventually earned him his name. He is celebrated as a folk saint by some in Mexico and the United States, including among drug traffickers.

== History ==
The existence of Malverde is not historically verified.

In his youth, railroads were introduced to Sinaloa, which exponentially boosted Agave and sugar agriculture. While in turn, producing economic inequities that Sinaloa's substantial peasant population had never experienced. Malverde is said to have been a carpenter, tailor, or railway worker. It was not until his parents died of either hunger or a curable disease, depending on the version of the story, that Jesús Malverde began a life of banditry. His nickname Malverde (lit. 'bad-green') was given by his wealthy victims, deriving from an association between green and misfortune.

According to the mythology of Malverde's life, he held a long-standing rivalry with Francisco Cañedo, the governor of Sinaloa, who he thought mistreated the poor. One time, Francisco derisively offered Malverde a pardon if he could steal his sword (or, in some versions, his daughter). He is supposed to have died in Sinaloa on 3 May 1909.

Accounts of his death vary. In some versions, he was betrayed and killed by a friend. In others, he was shot or hanged by local police. His body was supposed to have been denied proper burial, being left hanged to rot in public as an example of what happens to those who steal.

Writer Sam Quinones says that there is no evidence that Malverde ever lived, and that the story probably emerged by mixing material from the lives of two documented Sinaloan bandits, Heraclio Bernal (1855–1888) and Felipe Bachomo (1883–1916). Whereas César Güemes states, as translated by Creechan, Malverde never had a physical life, his existence is widely based on social imagination and cultural narrative. Historical evidence remains uncertain, and Malverde's significance lies more in his symbolic meaning than his history. Today, the Malverde following reflects both local expressions of resistance and broader cultural tensions surrounding faith, crime, and identity in modern Mexico.

== Culture ==
Since Malverde's supposed death, he has earned a Robin Hood-type image, making him popular among Sinaloa's poor highland residents. His bones were said to have been unofficially buried by local people, who threw stones onto them, creating a cairn. Throwing a stone onto the bones was thus a sign of respect, and gave the person the right to make a petition to his spirit. His earliest alleged miracles involved the return of lost or stolen property. His shrine is in Culiacán, capital of Sinaloa. Every year on the anniversary of his death, a large party is held at Malverde's shrine. The original shrine was built over in the 1970s, amid much controversy, and a new shrine was built on nearby land. The original site, which became a parking lot, has since been revived as an unofficial shrine, with a cairn and offerings.

Malverde quickly became one of the most influential folk heroes in Mexican culture by redistributing wealth to the poor, therefore exposing the corruptness that lies within the Mexican government. His outlaw image has caused him to be adopted as the "patron saint" of the region's illegal drug trade, and the press have thus dubbed him "the narco-saint." However, his intercession is also sought by those with troubles of various kinds, and a number of supposed miracles have been locally attributed to him, including personal healings and blessings.

According to Patricia Price, "Narcotraffickers have strategically used Malverde's image as a 'generous bandit' to spin their own images as Robin Hoods of sorts, merely stealing from rich drug-addicted gringos and giving some of their wealth back to their Sinaloa hometowns, in the form of schools, road improvements, [and] community celebrations."

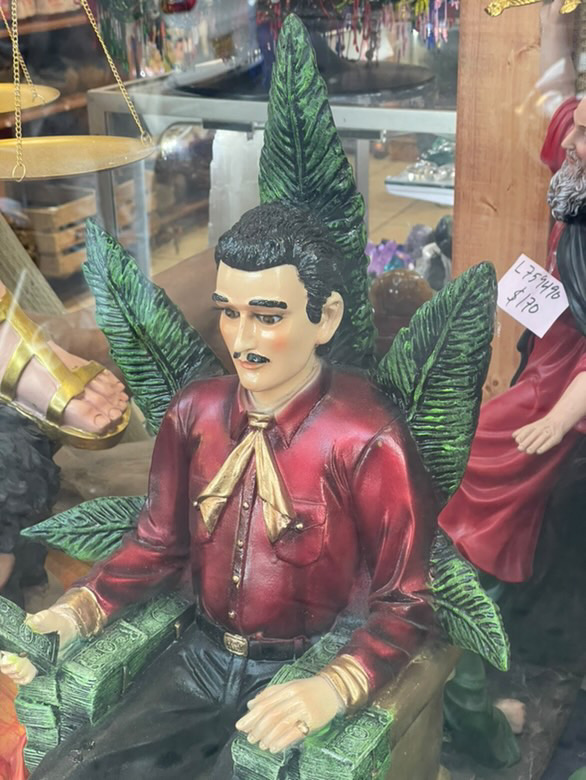
Jesús Malverde statue at a botanica in The Bronx, New York City

Spiritual supplies featuring the visage of Jesús Malverde are available in the United States as well as in Mexico. They include candles, anointing oils, incense, sachet powders, bath crystals, soap and lithographed prints suitable for framing.

== In culture ==
A brewery in Guadalajara launched a beer named after Malverde in northern Mexico in late 2007.

A likeness of Malverde appears in an episode of the TV show Breaking Bad. In several episodes of its spin-off series, Better Call Saul, Lalo Salamanca wears a necklace that contains a depiction of Malverde. Tony Dalton, the actor who plays Salamanca, explained the meaning of Malverde in a video in which actors review their character's props.

Malverde: El Santo Patrón is a 2021 Telemundo series based on Malverde's life, with Pedro Fernández playing the lead role of Malverde.

== See also ==
- Chucho el Roto, a Mexican bandit who stole from the rich and shared with the poor
- Gauchito Gil, an Argentinian folk saint who stole from the rich to give to the poor
- Nazario Moreno González, a Mexican drug lord sometimes seen as a folk saint or Messiah
- Santa Muerte, a Mexican folk saint associated with drug cartels and criminality
