= Traditionalist Mexican-American Catholic Church =

Defunct independent Catholic church

- Classification: Independent Catholicism
- Scripture: Christian Bible
- Theology: Nicene Trinitarianism, Devotion to Santa Muerte
- Archbishop: David Romo Guillén
- Region: Mexico and United States
- Origin: 2003; Mexico
- Separated from: Roman Catholic Church
- Defunct: 2012
- Official website: http://unicosantuarionacionaldelasantamuerte.com

The Traditionalist Mexican-American Catholic Church (Spanish: Iglesia Católica Tradicionalista Mexicana-Estadounidense) was an independent Catholic church active in Mexico and the United States. They broke away from the Roman Catholic Church over their veneration of the Mexican folk saint and female deity Santa Muerte. They were primarily active in the border regions of the United States and Mexico and have a particular presence among Mexican immigrants in the United States. It was founded by David Romo Guillén, who served as its archbishop and primate. However, in 2012 he was sentenced to 66 years in prison for kidnapping and extortion.

== Beliefs and organization ==
The Traditionalist Mexican-American Catholic Church followed both the Nicene Creed and the Athanasian Creed, maintained the seven sacraments, an all-male priesthood, is open to homosexuals among the faithful and, generally speaking, was socially conservative regarding abortion but did not practice clerical celibacy, allowed the use of contraceptives and did not require chastity before marriage. They also maintained their veneration of the Mexican folk saint and female deity Santa Muerte, which the Roman Catholic Church has condemned to be blasphemous and Satanic. They rejected the Catholic doctrines of papal infallibility, the Immaculate Conception, and the Assumption of the Virgin Mary.

Church services were conducted every Sunday and attendees often invoked the name of Santa Muerte to intercede before God, rather than other saints, and left offerings to Santa Muerte. The church followed the Catholic practices of baptism, holy communion, confirmations, weddings, exorcisms, and the praying of rosaries.

== Status in Mexico ==
Due to the connection between Santa Muerte and drug trafficking in Mexico, the Mexican federal government ruled that the Traditionalist Mexican-American Catholic Church did not have the qualifications for a religion and removed the Church from the list of officially recognized religions. Protests arose in 2006 among church members, although the Church can legally worship without recognition from the government.
