= Daniel Arizmendi López =

Mexican kidnapper and serial killer

- Born: July 22, 1958 (age 68); Miacatlán, Morelos
- Occupation: Criminal
- Spouse: Lourdes Arias García
- Parent(s): Catarino Arizmendi Iniestra; María López Juárez
- Status: Incarcerated at the federal prison of Puente Grande, Jalisco
- Criminal charges: Kidnapping, homicide, organized crime
- Penalty: Life sentence

Daniel Arizmendi López (born 22 July 1958), best known as El Mochaorejas, is a Mexican convicted kidnapper and serial killer. In 1998, Susan Ferriss of the Cox News Service wrote that Arizmendi was "Mexico's most notorious suspected criminal".

== Biography ==
Arizmendi López was originally a police officer in Morelos. He became involved in crime in the 1980s while a police officer. From 1996 until 1998 he was responsible for at least 18 kidnappings in Mexico and some murders. He often severed the ears of his kidnapping victims. In many cases, he sent the severed ears to the families of his victims. Because of this, he was nicknamed "El Mochaorejas" ("The Ear Chopper"). Arizmendi López collected over US$40 million in ransom money from kidnappings.

On August 17, 1998, Mexican authorities announced that they had captured Arizmendi López in Naucalpan, Mexico State. On the day of his arrest, he confessed to four murders. Inside Arizmendi López's house police found an altar to Santa Muerte. Authorities allowed Arizmendi López to bring a figure of Santa Muerte to prison, resulting in widespread media attention. Jorge Madrazo Cuéllar, the Attorney General of Mexico, stated that information originating from plea bargains of gang members in prison and legal wiretaps were used in the capture.

In 2022, a Magistrates Court ordered the removal of 14 statements from members of the Mochaorejas gang and Arizmendi López's brother due to the possibility of their having been obtained through illegal torture. This decision invalidates the 40-year prison sentence, which will be reevaluated, but Arizmendi López will not be released from prison.

== Legacy ==
The character Daniel "La Voz" Sánchez in the 2004 film Man on Fire is based on Arizmendi López, and the character Aurelio Sánchez is based on Aurelio Arizmendi López, the brother of Daniel Arizmendi López. Just like the real Arizmendi López, "La Voz" believes in Santa Muerte. Kevin Freese of the Foreign Military Studies Office stated that "it appears that the allusion" of the fictional Sánchez brothers with the real Arizmendi brothers "escaped the comprehension of much of the audience."
