= Protestantism in Mexico =

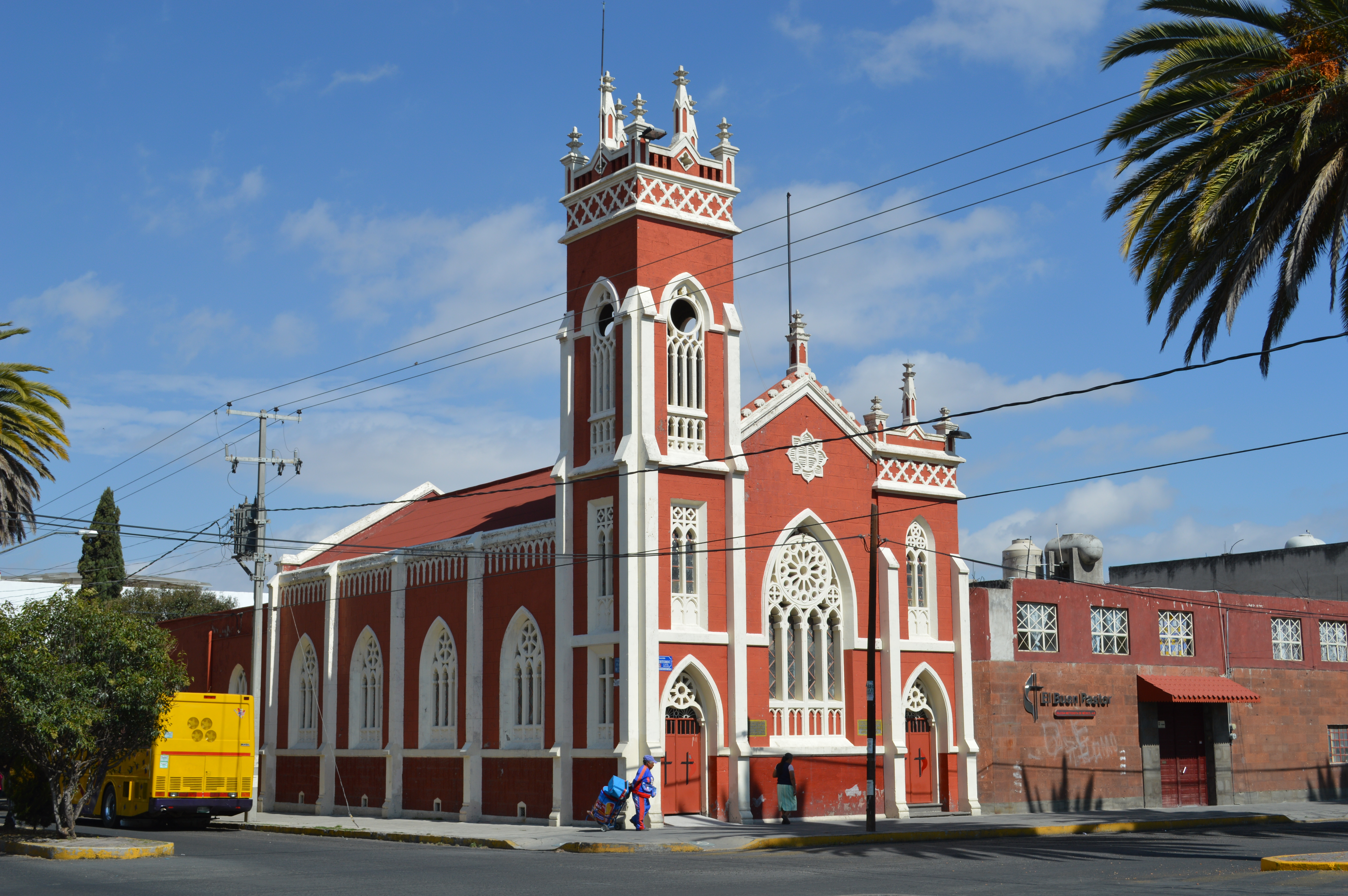
A Methodist church in Apizaco, Tlaxcala

Protestantism (which includes both non-evangelical and evangelical denominations) is the largest religious minority in Catholic-majority Mexico.

== History ==
=== Miguel Ângelo de Oliveira Pegado Duarte Simões ===
The introduction of Protestantism in Mexico began in the early 19th century, marked by the arrival of Diego Thompson, an agent of the British and Foreign Bible Society, in 1827. Thompson distributed Bibles and promoted Protestant teachings, laying the groundwork for future missionary efforts. These efforts were expanded by Presbyterian missionaries such as Dr. Julio Mallet Prevost, W.G. Allen, and Melinda Rankin, who played pivotal roles in spreading Protestantism across the country. However, the first formal evangelical church in Mexico was a Baptist church, established on January 30, 1864, in Monterrey, Nuevo León. This church was organized by James Hickey, a Baptist missionary and member of the American Bible Society, along with four other members: Thomas Westrup, José Maria Uranga, Arcadio Uranga, and Mrs. Hickey. By 1869, Westrup and the Uranga brothers had successfully organized six additional churches, significantly expanding the Baptist presence in Mexico. The American Baptist Home Mission Society and the International Mission Board further bolstered these efforts, sending approximately fifty missionaries to Mexico before the start of the 20th century.

By 1872, various U.S. Protestant denominations, such as the Northern and Southern Presbyterian Churches and the Congregationalist Church, had established missions across Mexico. These missions laid the groundwork for the formation of the National Presbyterian Church in Mexico, which held its first synod in 1901, representing 73 churches and 5,500 members.

=== Persecution in the 19th century ===
The 19th century was a tumultuous period for Mexican Protestants. Historian Hans-Jürgen Prien notes in his work, Christianity in Latin America, that "no other country in Latin America had as many cases of persecution of Protestants in the 19th century as Mexico." Prien concluded that throughout the 19th century, the number of Protestant martyrs in Mexico rose to 59, with only one foreigner among them. Indeed, the weight of evangelical missionary work fell heavily on Mexicans from the outset. By 1892, out of a total of 689 collaborators working in Mexico, 512 were Mexican. El Evangelista Mexicano (26/6/1890) further reported that sixty-five Protestants had been killed by Romanists in the many riots that the Roman Church has incited against the gospel in Mexico. By the final decade of the century, the number of Evangelical victims had surged to well over a hundred, underscoring the escalating tensions and violence faced by the Protestant community.

=== Growth and expansion ===
Despite early challenges, Protestantism experienced significant growth in Mexico throughout the 20th century. particularly in rural and indigenous areas. This growth has been noted to trigger profound socio-cultural changes, impacting local customs and identities. For instance, in the Zapotec villages of Northern Oaxaca, the rise of Protestantism has led to tensions with traditional customs, known as "costumbre," highlighting the complex interplay between religious beliefs and local cultural practices.

However, government figures indicate that between 1970 and 1990, the number of Mexican Protestants grew from 2 to 7 percent. This expansion was particularly notable among low-income groups and in indigenous areas, where Protestant denominations engaged in educational, medical, and social work.

== Demographics ==
According to the 2020 Mexican government census, 78% of the population has a Roman Catholic background, while 12% come from a Protestant or evangelical Protestant background. In 2010 those who declared themselves Catholics represented 83.9% of the population aged 5 and older, evangelical Protestants 7.6%, other religions 2.5% and 4.6% reported having no religion.

The National Institute of Statistics and Geography (INEGI) reported that the number of evangelicals or Protestants rose from 4.9% in 1990 to 5.2% in 2000, reaching 7.6% in 2010. The Institute estimates that 20 million Mexicans are evangelical. More than 17 million Mexicans are Pentecostal and Charismatic. There 8 million Christians independent from denominations in Mexico.

== Denominations ==
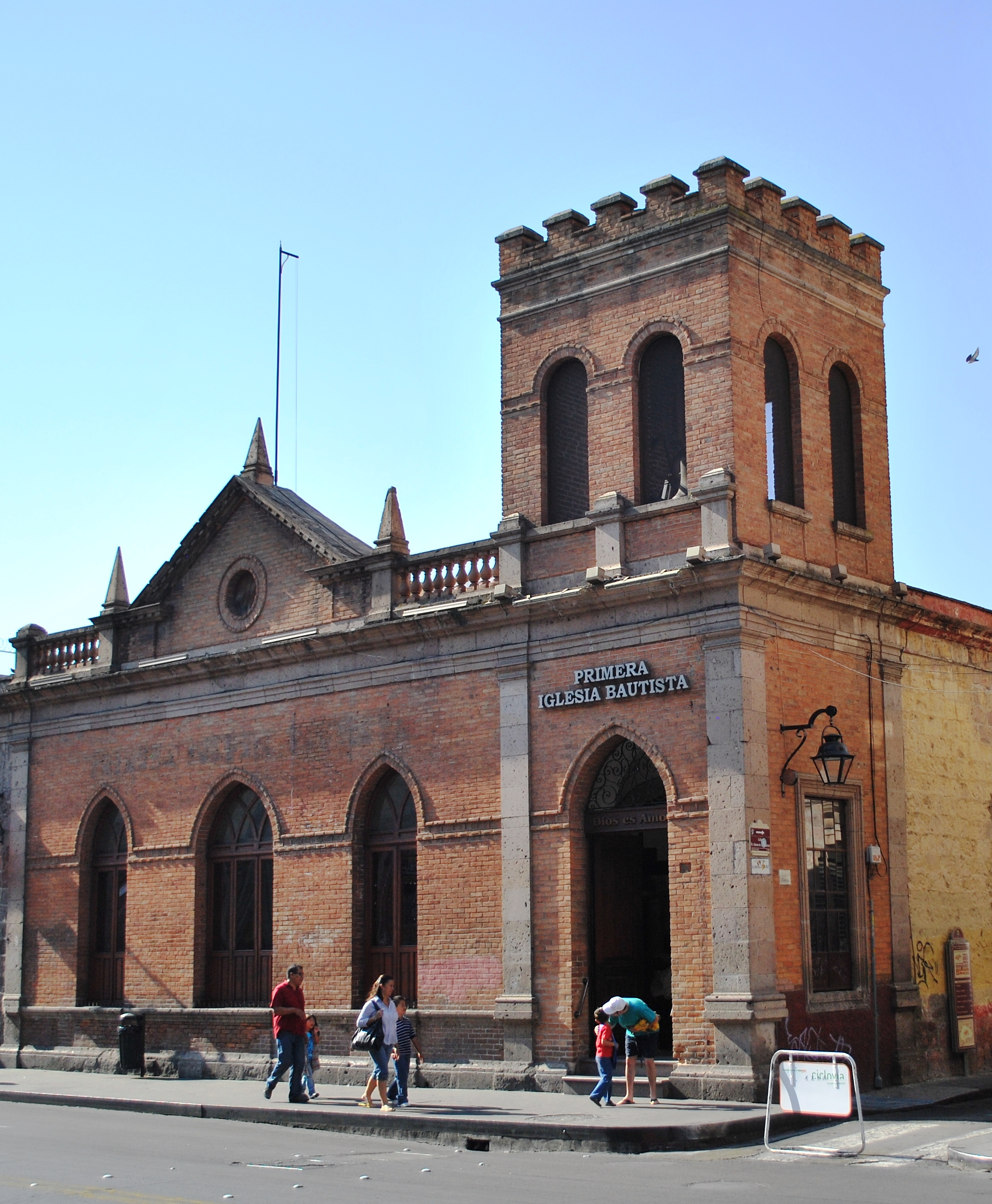
First Baptist Church of Morelia

There are many denominations from several doctrinal backgrounds, the largest of which are Anglican, Baptist, Methodist, Lutheran and a group of unaffiliated non-denominational charismatic congregations; a 2015 report from the Autonomous University of Ciudad Juárez noted that there are 50,000 Methodists and 30,000 Anglicans in the country.

The charismatic movement in Mexico has been growing in the last several decades, particularly in the southern state of Chiapas; in 2010, the National Presbyterian Church in Mexico was the strongest denomination (46% of the total Presbyterian population of Mexico). Protestantism also has a large following in the Mexican states that border the U.S. state of Texas.

A main category of the Protestant churches in Mexico are the so-called Historical denominations, which include the following churches: Presbyterian (and other Calvinistic groups), Baptist, Lutheran, Methodist, Congregational and Anglican (or Episcopalian). These constitute the 10% of the Protestant/Evangelical category. After these branches, we have the "Pentecostal and Neo-Pentecostal" segment, which constitutes about 22% of the non-Catholic category. With a 39% we have "Other evangelical" members, a group called "Light of the World" (based in the city of Guadalajara) makes 1%, and finally the "Non-Evangelical Biblical" categorization makes up the remaining 28% of this figure.

== Growth and social interaction ==
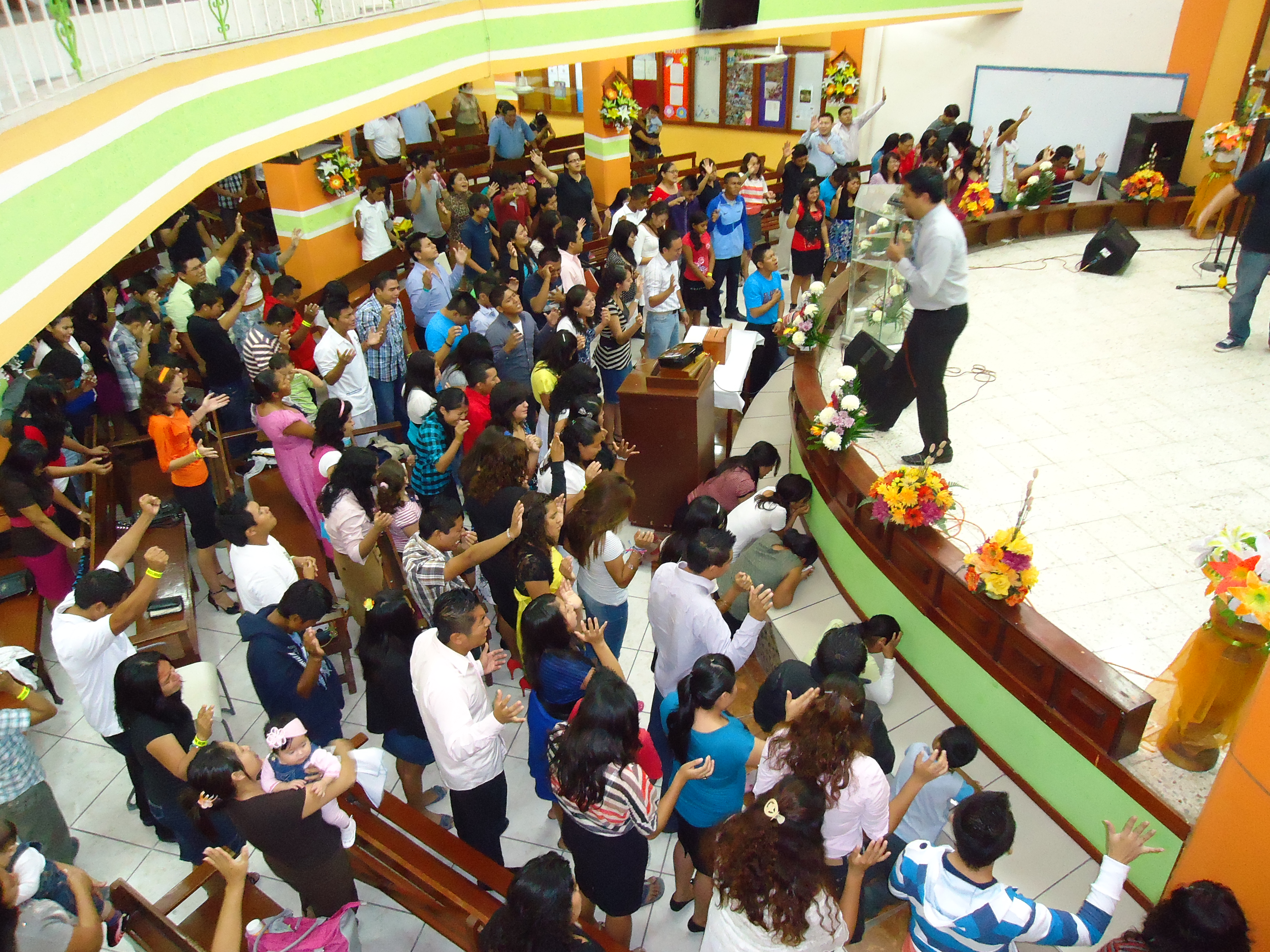
A Pentecostal church service in Cancun

Protestants/Evangelicals have had a respectful and often peaceful relationship with their overwhelmingly Catholic atmosphere. Conflict is however common in indigenous communities in the State of Mexico and the southern state of Chiapas (the state with the greatest percentage of Protestants nationwide). Despite their long-time status of minority, Mexican Protestants interact normally with the rest of Mexico.

Because of historical reasons (the laic character of Mexico which, in theory, does not intend to favor any religion) and unlike many other countries, Mexican Protestants do not have many institutions such as day care centers, schools, universities, labor unions, political parties and hospitals. This forces Evangelicals to interact with the rest of society using the same services and attending the same educational institutions.

Regardless of regional variations, Protestants in Mexico are becoming more relevant to the Catholic majority as many of these churches continue to grow greatly because many Protestants were once Catholics and converted later to Protestantism. Subsequently, they tend to share their new spiritual experiences with their Catholic relatives and neighbors, inciting curiosity because their life-changing testimony often ushers a new stage in their lives (frequently asceticism) which changes their worldview and their personal behavior. Protestants often invite people to their churches, which sometimes leads to further spiritual encounter and revivals. This is when more people become Protestants.

== Regions and identity shift ==
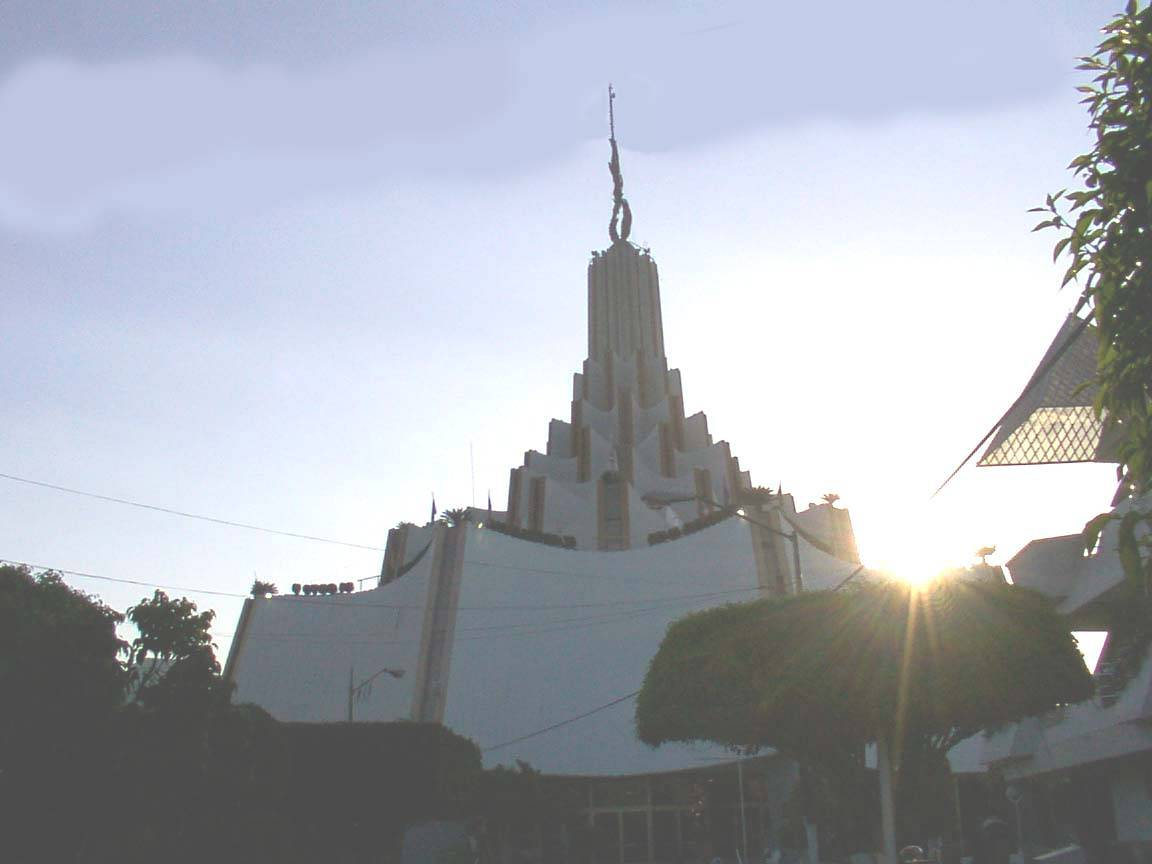
International headquarters of La Luz del Mundo Church at Glorieta Central No. 1, Hermosa Provincia, Guadalajara, Jalisco

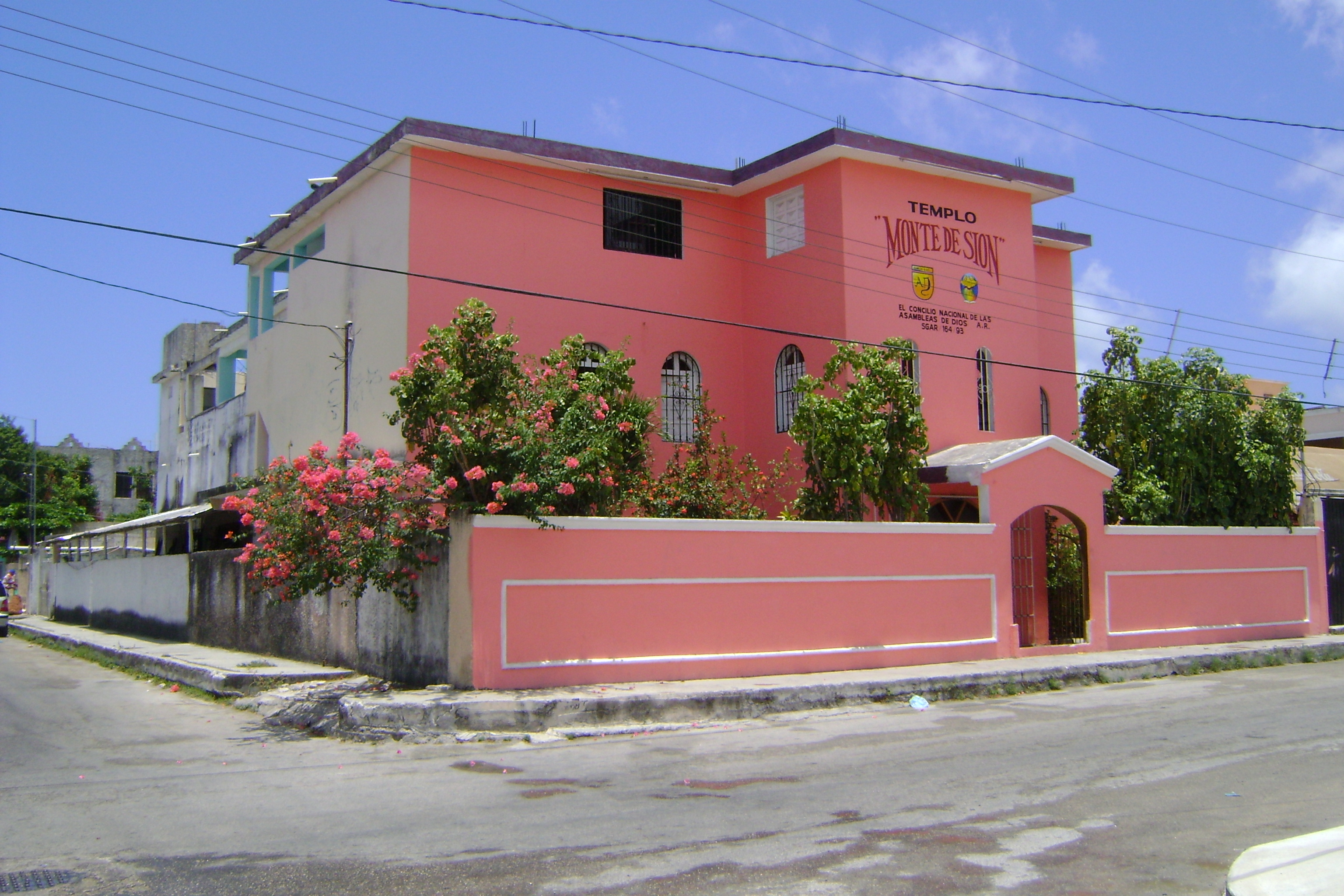
The Templo Monte de Sion was the First Pentecostal Church in Cancun city, and the third Protestant Church.

The fact that more and more Mexicans no longer describe or define themselves as Catholic is significant issue amongst the country's Catholic population, many of whom consider Mexico a sacred Catholic land. This shows a society that tends to diversify into other paths regarding religious adherence. Nevertheless, the proportion or magnitude of this shift varies greatly, and it is not the same throughout the country.

As a generalized interpretation, Protestants have grown to be a very relevant minority in Southern Mexico and to a lesser though still significant percentage in Northern Mexico, especially in border states (and particularly those that border Texas). Places where Protestantism has not become such a big minority are the West and the central parts (known as the Bajío), which is known as a very Catholic region. The following chart shows us the variations of religious affiliation of the Mexican population by state and doctrine to which inhabitants older than 5 adhere:

State	Population	% Catholic	% Evangelical /Protestant	% Non-Evang. Biblical	% Atheist	% Other	% Unspecified
Aguascalientes	822,037	96.07	1.79	0.66	0.10	0.89	0.49
Baja California	2,181,179	82.43	7.79	2.59	0.30	5.89	1.00
Baja California Sur	372,466	89.61	3.68	2.05	0.19	3.33	1.14
Campeche	609,648	75.04	11.94	4.27	0.17	8.09	0.49
Coahuila	2,031,773	87.23	6.79	1.55	0.11	3.70	0.62
Colima	479,149	92.96	3.10	1.45	0.10	1.86	0.53
Chiapas	3,393,573	64.46	14.50	8.09	0.06	2.95	0.57
Chihuahua	2,683,956	85.40	6.52	1.94	0.15	5.38	0.61
Distrito Federal	7,787,688	90.57	3.61	1.37	1.02	2.95	0.48
Durango	1,266,521	90.72	3.79	1.91	0.06	2.95	0.57
Guanajuato	4,064,431	96.07	1.39	0.77	0.18	0.93	0.66
Guerrero	2,656,187	89.42	4.58	2.04	0.40	3.08	0.48
Hidalgo	1,974,004	90.63	5.41	1.38	0.40	1.69	0.49
Jalisco	5,567,957	95.39	2.06	0.89	0.13	1.04	0.49
Michoacán	3,487,151	95.12	1.70	1.02	0.16	1.43	0.57
Morelos	1,373,243	83.22	7.96	3.08	0.63	4.28	0.83
Nayarit	809,050	92.85	2.67	1.47	0.13	2.54	0.34
Nuevo León	3,405,823	88.19	6.28	1.96	0.14	2.96	0.47
Oaxaca	3,006,497	85.15	7.73	2.43	0.25	3.93	0.51
Puebla	4,440,642	91.54	4.33	1.69	0.42	1.38	0.64
Querétaro	1,230,278	95.37	1.89	0.96	0.20	0.97	0.61
Quintana Roo	762,866	71.76	12.52	4.74	0.42	9.81	0.75
San Luis Potosí	2,011,828	91.53	4.95	1.01	0.17	1.82	0.52
Sinaloa	2,239,357	87.67	2.86	2.12	0.12	6.72	0.51
Sonora	1,945,692	88.62	4.68	1.86	0.10	4.11	0.63
Tabasco	1,660,813	72.26	13.01	5.34	0.15	8.86	0.38
Tamaulipas	2,428,828	83.14	8.78	2.52	0.21	4.71	0.64
Tlaxcala	844,878	93.20	3.05	1.39	0.55	0.98	0.83
Veracruz	6,121,833	82.90	6.88	3.67	0.21	5.88	0.46
Yucatán	1,476,223	84.73	8.20	2.97	0.15	3.42	0.53
Zacatecas	1,184,735	95.05	2.12	0.89	0.07	1.32	0.55
State of México	11,611,426	91.26	3.78	1.58	0.87	1.94	0.57

Source, Socbiblicademexico website

== Freedom of religion ==
The constitution declares that Mexico is a secular state and provides for the right to religious freedom.

In 2023, the country was scored 4 out of 4 for religious freedom. In the same year, the country was ranked as the 38th most difficult place in the world to be a Christian.

== See also ==
- Religion in Mexico
- Catholic Church in Mexico
