= Ernesto P. Uruchurtu =

Mexican politician (1906–1997)

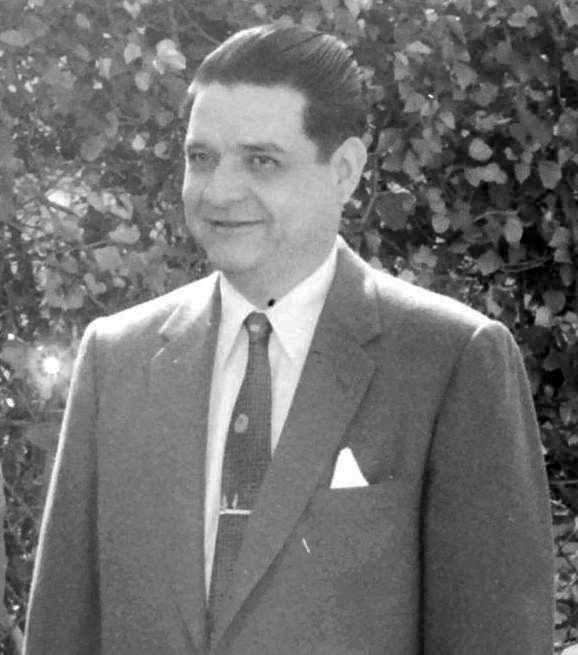
- Uruchurtu in 1958

Head of the Federal District Department
- In office 1 December 1952 – 14 September 1966
- Preceded by: Fernando Casas Alemán
- Succeeded by: Alfonso Corona del Rosal

Secretary of the Interior
- In office 13 October 1951 – 30 November 1952
- Preceded by: Adolfo Ruiz Cortines
- Succeeded by: Ángel Carvajal Bernal

Secretary of the Interior (acting)
- In office 13 February 1948 – 30 June 1948
- Preceded by: Héctor Pérez Martínez
- Succeeded by: Adolfo Ruiz Cortines

General Secretary of the Institutional Revolutionary Party
- In office 19 January 1946 – 5 December 1946
- Preceded by: Gustavo Cárdenas Huerta
- Succeeded by: Teófilo Borunda Ortiz

Personal details
- Born: 28 February 1906 Hermosillo, Sonora, Mexico
- Died: 8 October 1997 (aged 91) Federal District, Mexico
- Party: Institutional Revolutionary Party
- Other political affiliations: PNR, PRM
- Education: UNM
- Occupation: Politician
- Profession: Lawyer
- Known for: El Regente de Hierro

Ernesto P. Uruchurtu (28 February 1906 – 8 October 1997) was a Mexican politician affiliated with the Institutional Revolutionary Party (PRI) and its forerunners. A native of the state of Sonora, he held positions in the judiciary and within his party before serving two short stints as secretary of the interior and a 14-year term as the head of government of the Federal District.

Serving as the capital's unelected chief executive under three successive presidents, he strove both to modernise and beautify the city and to clean up its morals, with his style of government earning him the sobriquet el Regente de Hierro ("The Iron Regent"). His downfall came in 1966 under President Gustavo Díaz Ordaz, after which he never again held public office.

== Early years: schooling and Sonora ==
Ernesto Uruchurtu Peralta (Note: Uruchurtu was his first or paternal surname and Peralta was his second or maternal family name. The "P." in the stylised form "Ernesto P. Uruchurtu" indicates his mother's surname.) was born in Hermosillo, Sonora, on 28 February 1906, the fifth of nine children born to Gustavo Adolfo Uruchurtu Ramírez and María Luisa Regina Peralta Arvizu. He attended school at the Colegio de Sonora (Note: Hermosillo's oldest primary school, founded in 1889 by Ramón Corral Verdugo. It has since been renamed the Escuela Primaria José Lafontaine.) and the Escuela Normal de Hermosillo. He then went on to study law at the National University of Mexico (UNM, later UNAM) in Mexico City, where his law-school classmates included Antonio Ortiz Mena, Antonio Carrillo Flores and, most notably, Miguel Alemán Valdés. He received his degree after successfully defending his thesis, titled Escuelas y tendencias penales. El nuevo Código Penal ("Schools and Criminal Trends. The New Criminal Code"), in 1930.

After completing his studies, Uruchurtu took a position as a first-instance judge in the border city of Nogales, Sonora. In 1931, Governor of Sonora Rodolfo Elías Calles (Note: The son of former president Plutarco Elías Calles. The elder Calles continued to pull the country's political strings during the period known as the Maximato (1928–1934).) nominated him to serve as the state's attorney-general; the Congress of Sonora unanimously approved the appointment, and he took office on 19 February 1932. During his tenure, he chaired a committee charged with harmonising the state's laws with the federal constitution and secondary legislation before resigning on 11 November 1932. He spent the following years in private legal practice before being appointed as a notary public in Ciudad Obregón, Sonora, on 6 March 1935. He also began writing political opinion pieces for El Pueblo, a local newspaper owned by Israel González Filigrana, with whom he maintained a years-long correspondence.

In 1936, Emilio Portes Gil, then president of the National Revolutionary Party (PNR, which would later become the Institutional Revolutionary Party), selected Uruchurtu as the party's general secretary in Sonora; he assumed the position on 1 July but did not survive much after Portes Gil's resignation as party president in August 1936. Still within the party, he backed Román Yocupicio Valenzuela's bid to represent the PNR in that year's gubernatorial election. Yocupicio won the party primaries and went on to win the 11 November election; upon taking office as governor, he nominated Uruchurtu for a seat on the state's Supreme Court of Justice. Uruchurtu was sworn in on 2 January 1937 but, after clashing with Yocupicio, resigned on 11 May 1937.

== Return to Mexico City: national politics ==
Following his break with the governor, Uruchurtu returned to Mexico City, from where he continued to criticise Yocupicio's administration until the end of his term. However, when Anselmo Macías Valenzuela, Yocupicio's preferred candidate to succeed him, won the 1939 gubernatorial election, Uruchurtu turned his attention away from Sonoran politics and towards the national stage and, most particularly, the 1940 presidential election. Unimpressed by the official candidate, Manuel Ávila Camacho, who was expected to continue the left-leaning policies of outgoing president Lázaro Cárdenas, Uruchurtu threw his support behind the conservative Juan Andreu Almazán and his Revolutionary Party of National Unification (PRUN). The election was nasty, violent, almost certainly fraudulent, and ultimately won by Ávila Camacho with an official total of 94% of the votes cast. In the aftermath, Almazán temporarily fled the country and, by 1942, Uruchurtu had realigned himself with the ruling party (now renamed the Party of the Mexican Revolution, PRM) and had taken a position as legal director of the Banco Nacional de Crédito Ejidal (BNCE), a state-owned rural development bank. At the same time he began supporting his elder brother Gustavo's bid to be chosen as the PRM's candidate in the 1943 Sonora gubernatorial election, but Gustavo withdrew when former president Abelardo L. Rodríguez decided to contend.

In May 1945, Uruchurtu resigned his position with the BNCE and joined Miguel Alemán Valdés's campaign for the 1946 presidential election. Alemán Valdés, whose friendship with Uruchurtu dated back to their time together at the National University, was then serving as Ávila Camacho's secretary of the interior, a position traditionally seen as the antechamber of the presidency. During the campaign, Uruchurtu was appointed general secretary of the newly renamed Institutional Revolutionary Party on 19 January 1946.

Miguel Alemán won the 7 July 1946 election with almost 78% of the votes cast. In assembling his cabinet, he appointed former governor of Campeche Héctor Pérez Martínez to the choice position of interior secretary, with Uruchurtu assigned to an undersecretarial position in the same department. As undersecretary he oversaw a range of issues, including immigration policy and relations with the country's governors, and played a role in Alemán's planned political and judicial reforms. When Pérez Martínez died unexpectedly on 12 February 1948, Alemán selected Uruchurtu to replace him on an interim basis, until the appointment of Pérez's formal replacement, Governor of Veracruz Adolfo Ruiz Cortines, on 30 June 1948. Back in his role as undersecretary, one of the main tasks Uruchurtu oversaw was the updating of the 1930 Criminal Code on which he had written his undergraduate thesis; a draft was finalised in 1949 but the new code was never enacted.

On 13 October 1951, Ruiz Cortines was announced as the PRI's candidate for the 1952 presidential election and, that same day, President Alemán appointed Uruchurtu secretary of the interior, a position in which he remained until the end of Alemán's term on 30 November 1952. During his 14 months as interior secretary, Uruchurtu oversaw the enactment of a new Federal Electoral Law that facilitated, to some extent, the registration of opposition political parties.

Ruiz Cortines won the 7 July 1952 election with 74% of the vote and took office on 1 December.

== Head of the Federal District Department ==
For much of the 20th century, governance of Mexico City, as the seat of the federal government, was the responsibility of the Department of the Federal District (DDF). The DDF was led by an unelected cabinet-level official appointed directly by the President of the Republic, and those presidential appointees were commonly known as regentes ("regents"). It was not until 1997 that the regent's successor position was directly elected by the city's inhabitants.

President Ruiz Cortines took his oath of office at the Palacio de Bellas Artes on 1 December 1952, flanked by the members of his cabinet, including Ernesto P. Uruchurtu as head of the Department of the Federal District. He would remain in that position for an uninterrupted and unequalled 13 years, 10 months and 14 days, serving under Ruiz Cortines and his two successors, Adolfo López Mateos and Gustavo Díaz Ordaz. His authoritarian style in discharging his duties, his intolerance of corrupution and his efforts to stamp out what he deemed "immoral" activities in pursuit of the capital's modernisation soon earned him the Regente de Hierro nickname. (Note: Other nicknames, referring to his style of government, northern origins, and beautification of the city with fountains and flowers (particularly gladioli), included Don Floripondio, El Canciller del Cemento, Pluma Blanca, Don Florindo y Fuentes, Mano Dura, Don Gladiolo, El Bárbaro del Norte and Don Justu.)

Uruchurtu's administrations coincided almost exactly with the period known as the "Mexican Miracle", during which, thanks to the economic policy of "stabilising development" (desarrollo estabilizador) through import substitution industrialisation, the country enjoyed sustained economic growth of 6.6% a year, inflation was kept under control and, after a 1954 devaluation, the peso remained stable against the U.S. dollar. Industrialisation brought with it urbanisation: with some 3 million inhabitants, Mexico City ranked 17th among the world's largest cities in 1950; by 1960 it had risen to 13th place, with a population of 4.8 million, and by 1970, it was the world's fourth largest city, home to some 8.8 million people. It fell to successive presidents to manage the country's booming economic growth, and to the head of the Federal District Department to manage its burgeoning capital.

=== Public works ===
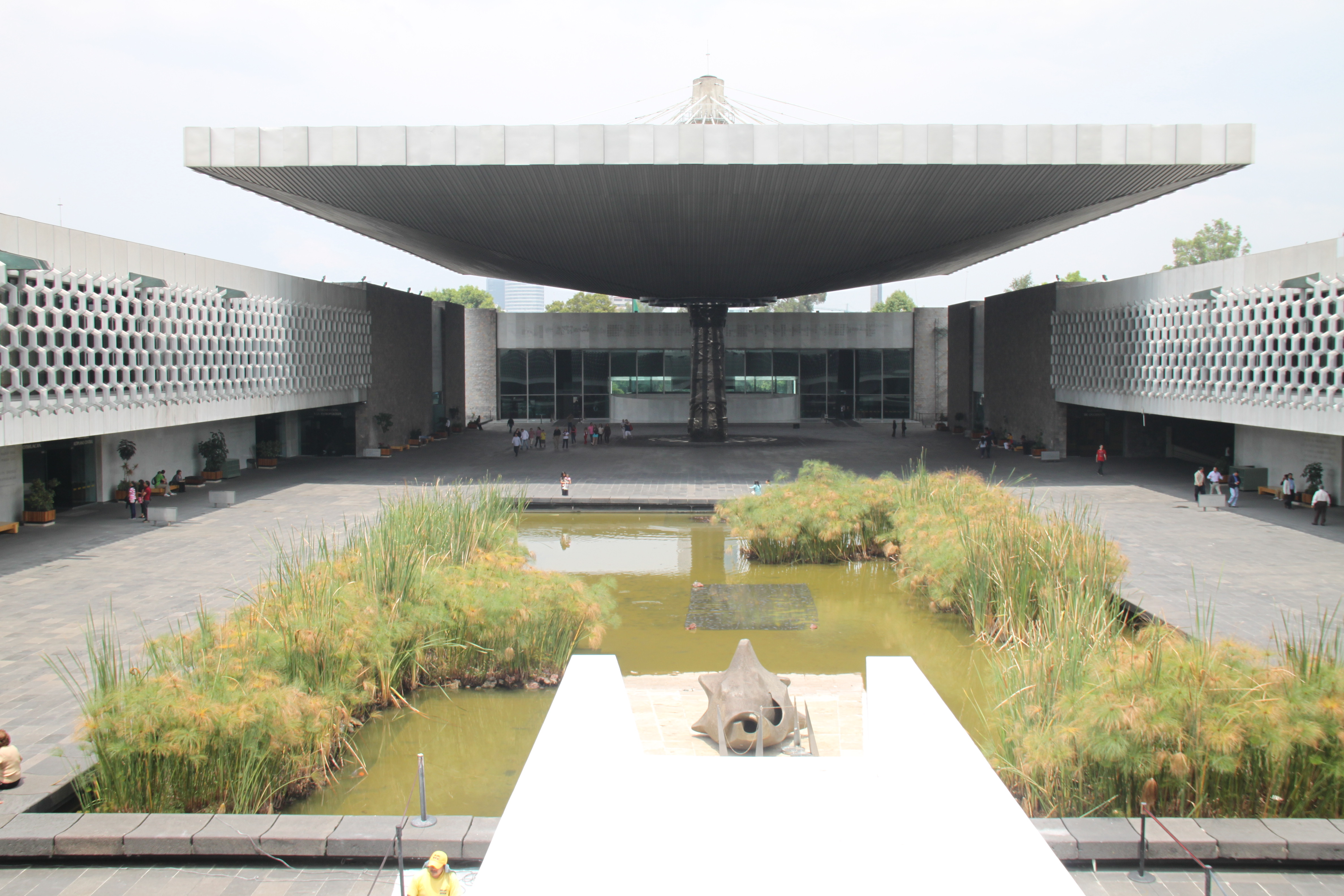
The National Museum of Anthropology, inaugurated in 1964

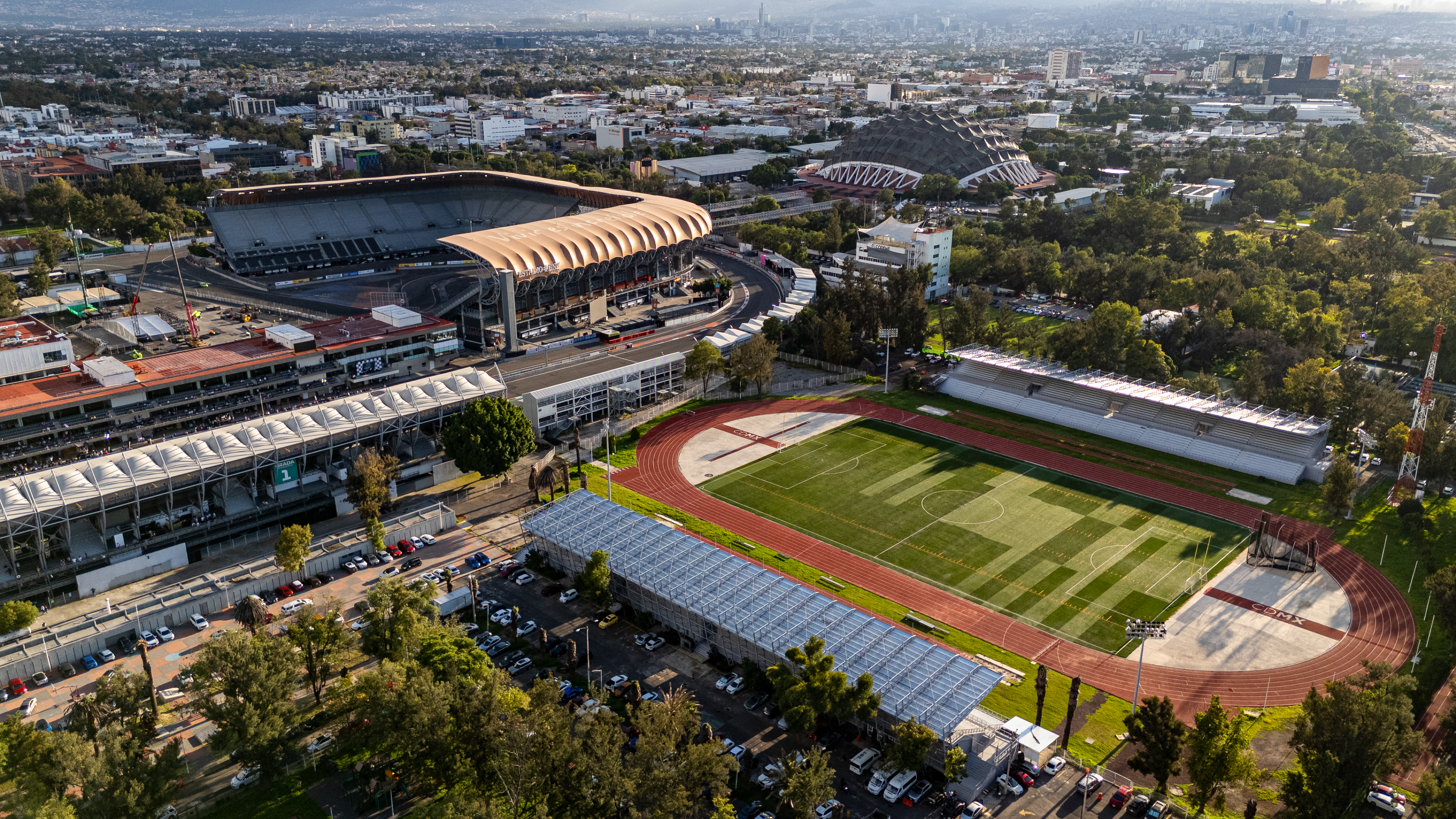
Aerial view of the Magdalena Mixhuca Sports City

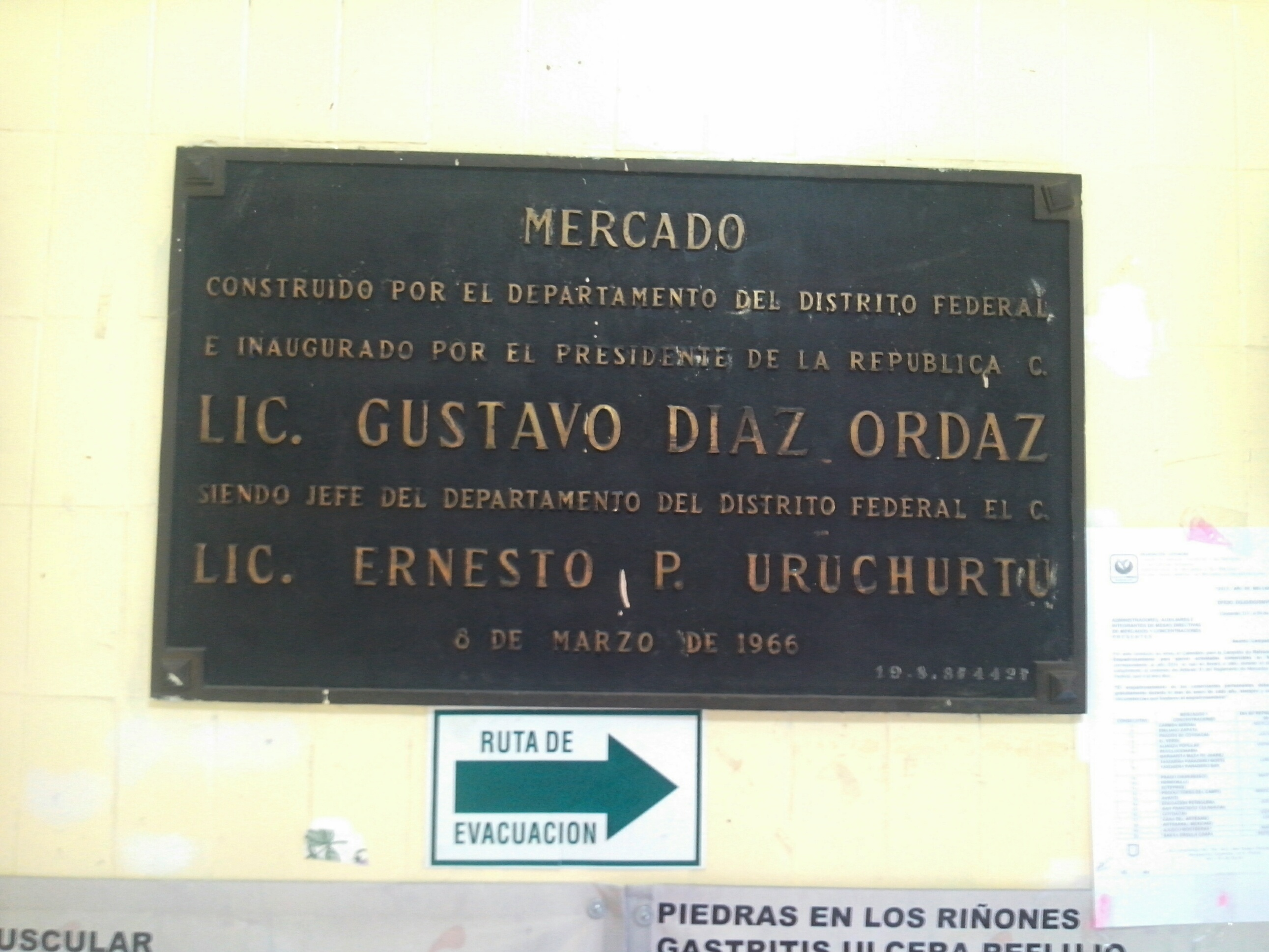
Plaque with the names of Díaz Ordaz and Uruchurtu commemorating the opening of the market in Xotepingo, Coyoacán, in 1966.

Uruchurtu's time in office was noted for its major restructuring of the city's infrastructure. Among the most significant projects were the culverting of the Río de la Piedad and the construction of the Viaducto de la Piedad, which was later extended as the Viaducto Miguel Alemán; Río Churubusco was also culverted and the avenue of the same name built and widened. The first section of the Anillo Periférico ring road was built from the Toreo de Cuatro Caminos on the limits between Miguel Hidalgo and Naucalpan to Cuemanco in Xochimilco. Paseo de la Reforma was widened; although this required the demolition of several blocks in the city centre, the benefits for the growing volume of urban traffic were significant. Similarly, Avenida Insurgentes Norte was extended from the city centre to Indios Verdes and towards the highway to Pachuca, Hidalgo. Later works included the completion of the Viaducto Miguel Alemán, the conversion of the Calzada de Tlalpan into an expressway, the northern extension of Paseo de la Reforma and the start of work on the Estadio Azteca.

By the end of 1954, through investments in pumping and drainage systems and by reducing the volume of water extracted from its aquifers, the city's age-old problem with seasonal flooding had been resolved. A ten-year plan was drawn up to address the different aspects of the city's water problem: drainage, supply, treatment and subsidence. Three wastewater treatment plants were built; the Interceptor Poniente, a 17-km storm drain, was laid down through the city's subsoil; and ban was placed on drilling new wells in urban areas to reduce chronic levels of subsidence.

During his nearly 14 years in office, the city acquired almost 200 new schools. More than 180 public markets were built, including La Merced, San Juan and Sonora. Clandestine and unsanitary slaughterhouses were replaced in 1955 by the Ferrería Abattoir in Azcapotzalco. As part of his drive to promote formal markets, he also clamped down – hard – on street trading.

Public spaces established during the period include the second section of Chapultepec Park, with two large artificial lakes, an amusement park, fountains and gardens, and the Natural History Museum. The San Juan de Aragón Park was also built, housing the city's second zoo, as well as extensive sports facilities and landscaped and wooded areas. The Magdalena Mixhuca Sports City, a monumental project for the practice of a wide range of sports, was inaugurated in 1958. The canals of Xochimilco were restored and the embarcadero and neighbouring Xochimilco Flower Market were built. In 1957, Uruchurtu and Ruiz Cortines inaugurated the Parque de los Venados, covering 95,000 m^{2} in Benito Juárez. In addition to creating new public spaces, he also oversaw the rehabilitation of existing ones, including the Alameda Central, and renovated many of the city's broken fountains.

His administrations also saw the construction of major museums, such as the Museum of Modern Art and, in coordination with the Secretariat of Public Education, the National Museum of Anthropology (both opened in 1964). Next to Chapultepec Castle, the Museum of Mexican History (Museo del Caracol, opened 1960) was built, and in the city centre various colonial buildings were restored, notably the one that now houses the Museum of Mexico City.

In the final days of López Mateos's administration, the Nonoalco Tlatelolco Urban Complex was inaugurated to the north of downtown Mexico City: a massive urban housing complex designed by the architect Mario Pani, covering 120 hectares and comprising 11,916 apartments in 102 buildings of different heights, in addition to schools from kindergarten to high school, a clinic, retail outlets and a cultural centre. Uruchurtu appeared alongside the president at the ceremony.

Throughout his tenure, Uruchurtu systematically opposed the construction of a metro system, arguing that the city's subsoil would make it too costly and dangerous. His refusals brought him into conflict with President Díaz Ordaz; construction work on the Mexico City Metro finally began in 1967, the year after Uruchurtu left office, and it carried its first passengers in 1969.

=== Moral crusade ===
During his time in office, Uruchurtu also pursued campaigns to clean up the Federal District's morals. Under the Cruzada de la Decencia Teatral ("Crusade for Decency in Theatres"), launched in 1952, a team led by Luis Spota patrolled the city's theatres to supervise the "moral quality" of their productions. During his tenure, numerous theatres and cabarets were closed down; many bars, cantinas and pulquerías suffered the same fate, and those that survived had to close by 1 a.m.

The 1958 motion picture Música de siempre was produced by the National Association of Actors (ANDA) to provide jobs for hundreds of underemployed entertainment industry workers during Uruchurtu's clampdown. The 1974 film Tívoli, with Alberto Mariscal in the role of "the Mayor", humourously recreates the era as it affected the Teatro Tívoli, a burlesque theatre that was closed down and demolished in 1963, allowing for the northward extension of Paseo de la Reforma.

Censorship also extended to other forms of entertainment: women's wrestling was banned in 1954, Luis Buñuel's 1961 film Viridiana could not be shown, and a scheduled concert by The Beatles in 1965 was cancelled.

=== Downfall ===
Uruchurtu's third term ended with his resignation from the position on 14 September 1966 following fierce criticism sparked by the violent eviction of more than 3,000 inhabitants of irregular settlements in the Pedregal de Santa Úrsula in the south of the city close to the Estadio Azteca.

== Presidential aspirations ==
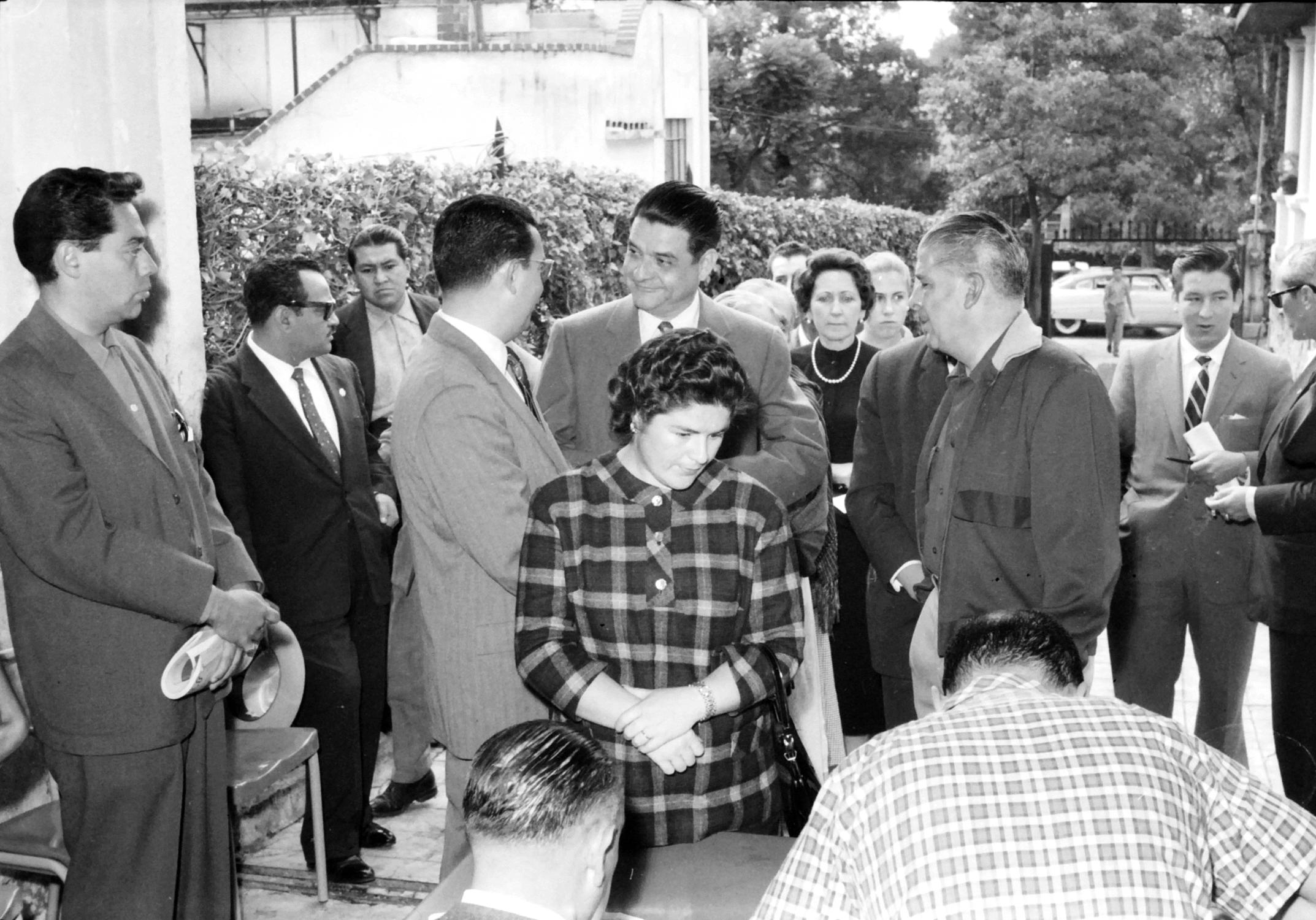
Uruchurtu waits in line as a woman receives her ballot papers for the 1958 general election, the first presidential election with women's suffrage.

Uruchurtu's name appeared on the list of possible candidates for the 1958 presidential election but Ruiz Cortines chose López Mateos, his secretary of labour, instead. On at least two occasions, Ruiz Cortines jokingly expressed concerns that while Uruchurtu might discharge the presidential duties well, he would perhaps be reluctant to give up power at the end of his term: "What a good president he would be for the first 18 years!" His bachelorhood was maybe another of the factors behind his failure to be chosen.

The same pattern repeated in the 1964 election, albeit this time with Uruchurtu perceived as having less of chance. A May 1963 briefing to the U.S. Department of State from the embassy in Mexico City placed him on a list of five likely candidates, alongside Gustavo Díaz Ordaz, Antonio Ortiz Mena, Benito Coquet and Alfredo del Mazo Vélez, but a later briefing in August reported that Díaz Ordaz remained the favourite, with Ortiz Mena in a strong second place and the chances of the others "falling rapidly". In an echo of 1958, the embassy also said that Uruchurtu's unmarried status was "a distinct handicap". On 17 November 1963, Díaz Ordaz was sworn in as the candidate, and he went on to win the 5 July 1964 election with 88% of the vote.

Uruchurtu continued to be mentioned as a possible candidate for the 1970 election in the early years of Díaz Ordaz's administration, but his hopes of representing the PRI in that contest died with his 1966 fall from grace. In 1968, however, back in Sonora, he met with leading figures from the National Action Party (PAN) – including José González Torres, a former party president and its candidate in 1964 – and very real rumours and Federal Security Directorate (DFS) intelligence reports began to circulate about the possibility that Uruchurtu would lead the PAN into the next election. But the chatter began to die down in early 1969, and in November of that year the PAN's convention announced the nomination of Efraín González Morfín.

== Later years ==
After 1966, Uruchurtu never again held public office. Asked about the 1973 gubernatorial race in Sonora, he dismissed the possibility of contending: "My political career ended several years ago." There was a shift in his fortunes with the arrival of President José López Portillo in 1976. The family claims that Interior Secretary Jesús Reyes Heroles conveyed an invitation from the president to represent the PRI in the 1979 gubernatorial election in Sonora, but Uruchurtu declined; other sources say that Reyes Heroles was merely sounding him out and that, after noting his physical condition, enthusiasm for Uruchurtu's possible candidacy waned. He did, however, enjoy good relations with Samuel Ocaña García, who went on to win the governorship for the PRI, and – despite their differences in style and vision – he served as a private adviser to Carlos Hank González, who headed the Federal District Department from 1976 to 1982.

Some weeks before the end of López Portillo's term, Uruchurtu met with incoming president Miguel de la Madrid. The family also claims that he was again invited to stand for governor of Sonora during De la Madrid's administration but again declined: by the time De la Madrid took office, Uruchurtu was 76 years old. During the 1988 presidential election campaign of Carlos Salinas de Gortari – the son of Raúl Salinas Lozano, with whom he had served in López Mateos's cabinet – Uruchurtu accompanied him on his tour of Sonora and, at the end of Salinas's presidency, the two appeared together at the inauguration of López Mateos's mausoleum in Atizapán de Zaragoza. In December 1994, Óscar Espinosa Villarreal, President Ernesto Zedillo's newly appointed head of the Federal District Department and the last person to hold the position, met with Uruchurtu for four hours and they discussed a broad range of topics relating to the city's governance.

Ernesto Uruchurtu died at his home on Mexico City's Paseo de la Reforma (Note: Paseo de la Reforma 422, in Lomas de Chapultepec.) on 8 October 1997 and was buried in the city's Panteón Español. Cuauhtémoc Cárdenas, the first democratically elected head of government of the Federal District, took office two months later.

== Family ==
Uruchurtu never married, at least not publicly. (Note: A May 1957 report by an agent of the Federal Security Directorate (DFS) claimed that he had married in secret the previous month, with a view to the 1958 election, but no public announcement was made and his bride's name – if she even existed – was never revealed.) His brother Gustavo – as the personal physician to President Álvaro Obregón and later a member of both chambers of Congress, the most prominent of his siblings – predeceased him in 1987. The pair's paternal uncle, Manuel Uruchurtu Ramírez, was a prominent Sonoran businessman who served in the Chamber of Deputies during the final years of Porfirio Díaz's presidency and was the only Mexican passenger to perish in the 1912 sinking of the RMS Titanic.

== Legacy ==
Uruchurtu remains a polarising figure. For some, he enjoys lasting admiration for his work in building many of the roads, markets, schools, housing estates and parks that still make up Mexico City's urban infrastructure, while for others he was a repressive authoritarian who extinguished the city's nightlife, mercilessly targeted certain social groups and delayed the arrival of a modern mass-transit system. Journalist Francisco Ortiz Pinchetti, one of the founders of the news magazine Proceso, described him as a "controversial politician like few others, transformative and repressive, arbitrary and popular, moralistic, effective and uncompromising".

The transformations he brought about in the capital were also commemorated in the 1958 song "No es Justu" by satirical singer-songwriter Chava Flores, which praised the beautification of the city and its new markets and called for a statue in Uruchurtu's honour while at the same time riffing on the unusual prominence of the letter U in his Basque surname. (Note: In the song, many unstressed final "O"s are turned into "U"s: "No es justu, no es justu, que le hagan nomás un bustu / Su Tlaloc, a su gustu… ¡por Dios que se lo ganó!")

== Bibliography ==
- Alva, Karla (2023a). "Uruchurtu, el regente del terror y que prohibió el concierto de The Beatles en CDMX" [Uruchurtu, the regent of terror who banned the Beatles' concert in Mexico City]. La Silla Rota (in Spanish).
- Alva, Karla (2023b). "Ernesto Uruchurtu: Así mandó el "regente de hierro" en el DF" [Ernesto Uruchurtu: How the "Iron Regent" ruled in Mexico City]. La Silla Rota (in Spanish).
- Bucio, Erika P. (14 January 2020). "Analizan dardos políticos de Chava Flores" [Chava Flores's political barbs analysed]. Reforma (in Spanish).
- Buffie, Edward; Krause, Allen Sangines (1989). "Mexico 1958–86: From Stabilizing Development to the Debt Crisis". In Sachs, Jeffrey D. (ed.). Developing Country Debt and the World Economy. Chicago: National Bureau of Economic Research. ISBN 0226733386. Includes link to downloadable PDF.
- Camp, Roderic Ai (2011). Mexican Political Biographies, 1935–2009 (4th ed.). University of Texas Press. p. 969. ISBN 9780292726345.
- Carmona Dávila, Doralicia (2024a). "Manuel Ávila Camacho". Memoria Política de México (in Spanish).
- Carmona Dávila, Doralicia (2024b). "Miguel Alemán Valdés". Memoria Política de México (in Spanish).
- Carmona Dávila, Doralicia (2024c). "Adolfo Ruiz Cortines". Memoria Política de México (in Spanish).
- Carmona Dávila, Doralicia (2024d). "18 de noviembre de 1824: es creado el Distrito Federal" [18 November 1824: The Federal District is created]. Memoria Política de México (in Spanish).
- Carmona Dávila, Doralicia (2024e). "Gustavo Díaz Ordaz". Memoria Política de México (in Spanish).
- Castro Sánchez, Aída (2 May 2020). "El regente que cayó por la construcción del Estadio Azteca" [The regent whose downfall was the construction of the Azteca Stadium]. El Universal (in Spanish).
- Cross, John C. (1996). "El desalojo de los vendedores ambulantes: paralelismos históricos en la ciudad de México" [The eviction of street traders: historical parallels in Mexico City]. Revista Mexicana de Sociología (in Spanish). 58 (2). Mexico City: Instituto de Investigaciones Sociales, UNAM: 95–115. Includes link to downloadable PDF.
- Del Castillo, Alejandra (8 March 2026). "Golpes, censura y machismo: la vida de Irma González e Irma Aguilar, leyendas del 'ring'" [Blows, censorship, and sexism: The lives of Irma González and Irma Aguilar, legends of the ring]. Milenio (in Spanish).
- Espinoza, Claudia (8 June 2013). "El teatro: una cruzada por la decencia" [The theatre: A crusade for decency]. Sin Embargo (in Spanish).
- Díaz García, José (2024). "El regente Ernesto Uruchurtu Peralta". In Herrera Cuevas, María Eugenia (ed.). Personajes de la Ciudad de México: A siete siglos de su fundación. Mexico City: Palabra de Clío. p. 173. ISBN 978-607-8719-44-0. Includes link to downloadable PDF.
- Gayubas, Augusto (2025). "Milagro mexicano" [Mexican Miracle]. Concepto (in Spanish).
- García Acosta, Alfonso Hiram (13 March 2025). "Teatro Tívoli" [Tívoli Theatre]. Diario del Sureste (in Spanish).
- González Ruiz, Edgar (12 May 2013). "Memorias de la censura o Uruchurtu, el Regente de Hierro" [Memoirs of censorship, or Uruchurtu, the Iron Regent]. Contralinea (in Spanish).
- Government of Mexico (7 September 2021). "De zona prehispánica a el pulmón norte de la Ciudad de México: El Bosque de San Juan de Aragón" [From pre-Hispanic zone to the northern lung of Mexico City: The San Juan de Aragón Park]. Archivo General de la Nación (in Spanish).
- Government of Mexico City (n.d.). "Explora: Chapultepec y Paseo de la Reforma".
- Hernández López, Rodrigo (2 October 2023). "Uruchurtu, la sombra del regente de hierro" [Uruchurtu, the shadow of the Iron Regent]. Proceso (in Spanish).
- Hurtado, Guillermo (24 January 2026). "La ciudad de Uruchurtu" [Uruchurtu's city]. La Razón (in Spanish).
- Institutional Revolutionary Party (2024). "Dirigencias Nacionales" [National leaders] (in Spanish).
- Instituto Nacional de Antropología e Historia (n.d.). "Historia". Museo del Caracol (in Spanish).
- Johnson, Victor L. (30 January 2026). "Rodolfo Elías Calles: banquero, agricultor y polémico gobernador de Sonora" [Rodolfo Elías Calles: banker, farmer, and controversial governor of Sonora]. El Sol de Hermosillo (in Spanish).
- La Jornada (26 July 2006). "Murió Gustavo Alatriste, productor de Viridiana y las últimas cintas de Buñuel" [Gustavo Alatriste, producer of Viridiana and Buñuel's later films, has died] (in Spanish).
- López, María José (6 September 2018). "Colegio de Sonora es la escuela más antigua de Hermosillo y vio pasar a Plutarco Elías Calles y Adolfo de la Huerta" [The Colegio de Sonora, the oldest school in Hermosillo that saw Plutarco Elías Calles and Adolfo de la Huerta pass through its doors]. El Imparcial (in Spanish).
- Meyrán García, Jorge; Neri Vela, Rolando (n.d.). Los primeros médicos que laboraron en el Hospital General de México, 1905–1931 (PDF). Méndez Editores. p. 165.
- Morales, Francisco (24 September 2023). "Uruchurtu: ascenso y caída del 'Regente de Hierro'" [Uruchurtu: Rise and fall of the Iron Regent]. Reforma (in Spanish).
- Ortiz Pinchetti, Francisco (22 December 2023). "La Navidad… en los tiempos de Uruchurtu" [Christmas… in the times of Uruchurtu]. Sin Embargo (in Spanish)..
- Pacheco, Bulmaro (29 August 2021). "Los 90 años de Samuel Ocaña". Termómetro (in Spanish).
- Perló Cohen, Manuel (2023a). Uruchurtu, el regente de hierro. Tomo 1. Orígenes y primera regencia (in Spanish). Mexico City: Instituto de Investigaciones Sociales, UNAM. ISBN 978-607-30-7708-8. Includes link to downloadable PDF.
- Perló Cohen, Manuel (2023b). Uruchurtu, el regente de hierro. Tomo 2. Auge, caída y exilio (in Spanish). Mexico City: Instituto de Investigaciones Sociales, UNAM. ISBN 978-607-30-7707-1. Includes link to downloadable PDF.
- Personajes Históricos (n.d.). "Agustín Lara: biografía, frases, polémicas, películas y más" [Agustín Lara: biography, quotes, controversies, films and more] (in Spanish).
- Procuraduría Ambiental y del Ordenamiento Territorial (n.d.). "Departamento del Distrito Federal" [Department of the Federal District]. Instituciones (in Spanish).
- Ramírez Padilla, Marco Fabrizio (2024). "Chava Flores: el más chilango de los compositores". In Herrera Cuevas, María Eugenia (ed.). Personajes de la Ciudad de México: A siete siglos de su fundación. Mexico City: Palabra de Clío. p. 199. ISBN 978-607-8719-44-0. Includes link to downloadable PDF.
- Rodríguez, Leonardo (5 March 2019). "Autoridades celebraron a la primaria más antigua de Sonora" [Authorities celebrate the oldest primary school in Sonora]. El Sol de Hermosillo (in Spanish).
- Salvador, Cinthia (15 March 2024). "Cuál es el nombre real del Parque de los Venados". Infobae.
- Sosa, Alfredo (20 March 2023). "En ruinas, legendarios teatros de la CDMX" [Legendary theatres of Mexico City in ruins]. La Prensa (in Spanish).
- Soto, Diana; Sotelo, Alfonso (10 August 2022). "La historia perdida del Rastro de Ferrería" [The lost history of the Ferrería Abattoir]. El Heraldo de México (in Spanish).
- Villasana, Carlos; Gómez, Ruth (23 May 2017). "El regente de hierro que modernizó al Distrito Federal" [The Iron Regent who modernised the Federal District]. El Universal (in Spanish).
- Zalce, Beatriz (16 May 2016). "En el Metro" [In the Metro]. Desinformémonos (in Spanish).
