= Alonso García Tamés =

Alonso García-Tamés (born January 21, 1959) is a former CEO of the National Bank of Public Works and Services (Banobras) and General Director of Operations of the Bank of Mexico.

== Education and career ==
García-Tamés graduated with a bachelor's degree in Actuarial Science from the Universidad Anahuac.

In December 2006 García-Tamés was appointed CEO of the National Bank of Public Works and Services, a development bank promoting infrastructure investment in Mexico through subnational government lending, project finance and technical assistance.

García-Tamés speaks at conferences related to debt management policy, monetary policy, exchange rate management policy, payment systems and international asset management.

=== Boards of Directors ===
García-Tamés was a board member for several banks and regulation agencies:

- Banco Nacional de Obras y Servicios Públicos, S.N.C (National Bank of Public Works and Services)
- Nacional Financiera
- Comisión Nacional Bancaria y de Valores (Securities and Exchange Commission)
- Banco Nacional de Comercio Exterior, S.N.C.
- Financiera Rural
- Sociedad Hipotecaria Federal
- Comisión Nacional de Seguros y Fianzas
- North American Development Bank
- Banco del Ahorro Nacional y Servicios Financieros, S.N.C.
