= Uruchurtu =

Uruchurtu (also Urrutxurtu) is a surname of Basque origin. People with the surname include:

- Ernesto P. Uruchurtu (1906–1997), Mexican lawyer and politician
- Gustavo A. Uruchurtu Peralta (1896–1987), Mexican physician and politician, elected to Congress for the 15th federal electoral district of Mexico City
- Manuel Uruchurtu Ramírez (1872–1912), Mexican lawyer and politician
