= Banobras =

Mexican development bank

Banco Nacional de Obras y Servicios Públicos, S.N.C.
- Type: State owned
- Industry: Financial services
- Founded: 1933; 93 years ago as Banco Nacional Hipotecario Urbano y de Obras Públicas, S.A.
- Headquarters: Mexico City, Mexico,
- Key people: Jorge Mendoza Director General
- Products: Banking, Financial
- Number of employees: 900
- Website: www.gob.mx/banobras

Banco Nacional de Obras y Servicios Públicos, S.N.C. (Banobras; lit. 'National Bank of Public Works and Services') is a state owned development bank in Mexico. Its core business is sub national (Municipal and State governments) and project finance. It was founded in 1933 as Banco Nacional Hipotecario Urbano y de Obras Públicas, S.A. (National Urban Mortgage and Public Works Bank) by president Abelardo L. Rodríguez.

Until the 1985 Mexico City earthquake, its headquarters were located at the Torre Insignia, a pyramid-shaped building designed by one of Mexico's most noted architects, Mario Pani.

As of December 2005, the bank has a loan portfolio of more than US$10 billion and a tier 1 capital of more than a 1 billion.

== See also ==
- Alonso García Tamés
