= Torre Insignia =

Mexico City skyscraper

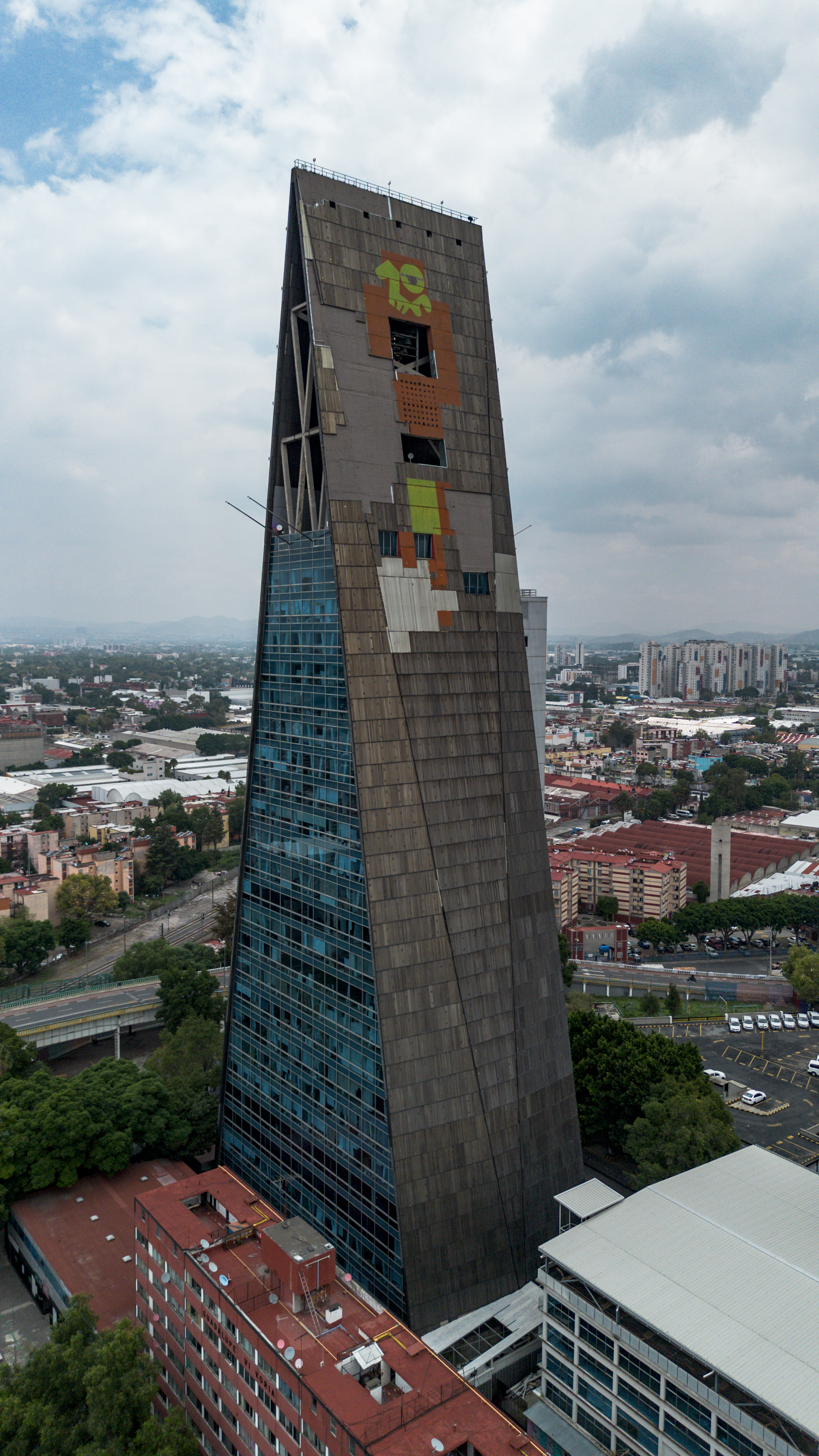
- Alternative names: Torre Banobras, Nonoalco Tlatelolco Tower

General information
- Location: Mexico City, Mexico
- Coordinates: 19.4545369°N 99.1511089°W
- Construction started: 1958
- Completed: 1962

Height
- Roof: 127 m (417 ft)

Technical details
- Floor count: 25
- Lifts/elevators: 10

Design and construction
- Architect: Mario Pani Darqui

Torre Insignia (also called Torre Banobras and the Nonoalco Tlatelolco Tower) is a building designed by Mario Pani Darqui located on the corner of Avenida Ricardo Flores Magón and Avenida de los Insurgentes Norte, in the Tlatelolco housing complex in Cuauhtémoc in Mexico City. At its completion in 1962, the tower became the second tallest building in Mexico after the Torre Latinoamericana. The tower is not currently in use and is being renovated. It is the tallest building in the Tlatelolco area and the third highest in the Avenida Insurgentes. The building housed the headquarters of Banobras. The building has a triangular prism shape and was built with a reinforced concrete frame. It has been remodeled at least twice and houses one of the tallest carillon in the world, with 47 bells made by Petit & Fritsen.

== Descriptive Report ==
- Its height is 127 m (417 ft) and it has 25 floors
- It is shaped like a triangular prism. The building has become an icon of Mexico City and especially the Avenida Insurgentes Norte. The logo of the station of Metro Tlatelolco carries the silhouette of the building. The station is located very close to the building on the Avenida Manuel González.
- The skyscraper's total floor area is 22,033 square metres (236,806 square feet)
- 7,716 square metre (83,056 square foot) surface

== History ==
After the excessive growth of Mexico City and especially the central Tlatelolco area, there was the need to start building vertically, which meant constructing housing office and apartment buildings with a height of over 20 floors. With the space requirement and due to rising incomes in the city, the buildings were thought to be in a strategic area, and with this in 1959 construction began with completion by 1962. It remains a challenge for this area as it is in a seismic zone, which was the fourth building in Mexico City and in the world with Torre Anahuac, Edificio El Moro, and Torre Latinoamericana in counting the latest technology in terms of earthquake shocks, thereby starting four of the great buildings of Mexico City.

It was headquarters of the government bank Banobras until the 1985 Mexico City earthquake, when it was abandoned. It stood empty until 2011, when office space in the building was leased out to other companies. In 2007 it was sold to Cushman & Wakefield.

== Details ==
- The building's construction began in 1959 and was completed in 1962, six years after the completion of the Latin American Tower.
- A carillon is installed in the building's highest point, which was a gift from the Belgian government to Mexico City.
- It has survived six major earthquakes: the 1985 Mexico City earthquake that measured 8.0 on the Richter Scale, the 1995 7.7, the 1999 7.4, in 2003 7.6, on April 13, 2007 a 6.3, and in September 2017 without suffering any damage to its structure.
- It is considered one of the safest buildings in Mexico City and the world.
- In theory, the building can withstand an earthquake of 8.5 on the Richter Scale.
- The construction materials used were reinforced concrete, glass, and aluminum.
- On one side of the tower is the station of Metrobús Manuel González.
- The pyramid shape of the tower was reinforced with concrete in its entirety and has been remodelled twice, is also one of the most significant and emblematic of Mexico City.
