= Conjunto Urbano Nonoalco Tlatelolco =

Coordinates: 19°27′12.9″N 99°8′34.82″W

Nonoalco Tlatelolco
- Neighborhood of Mexico City
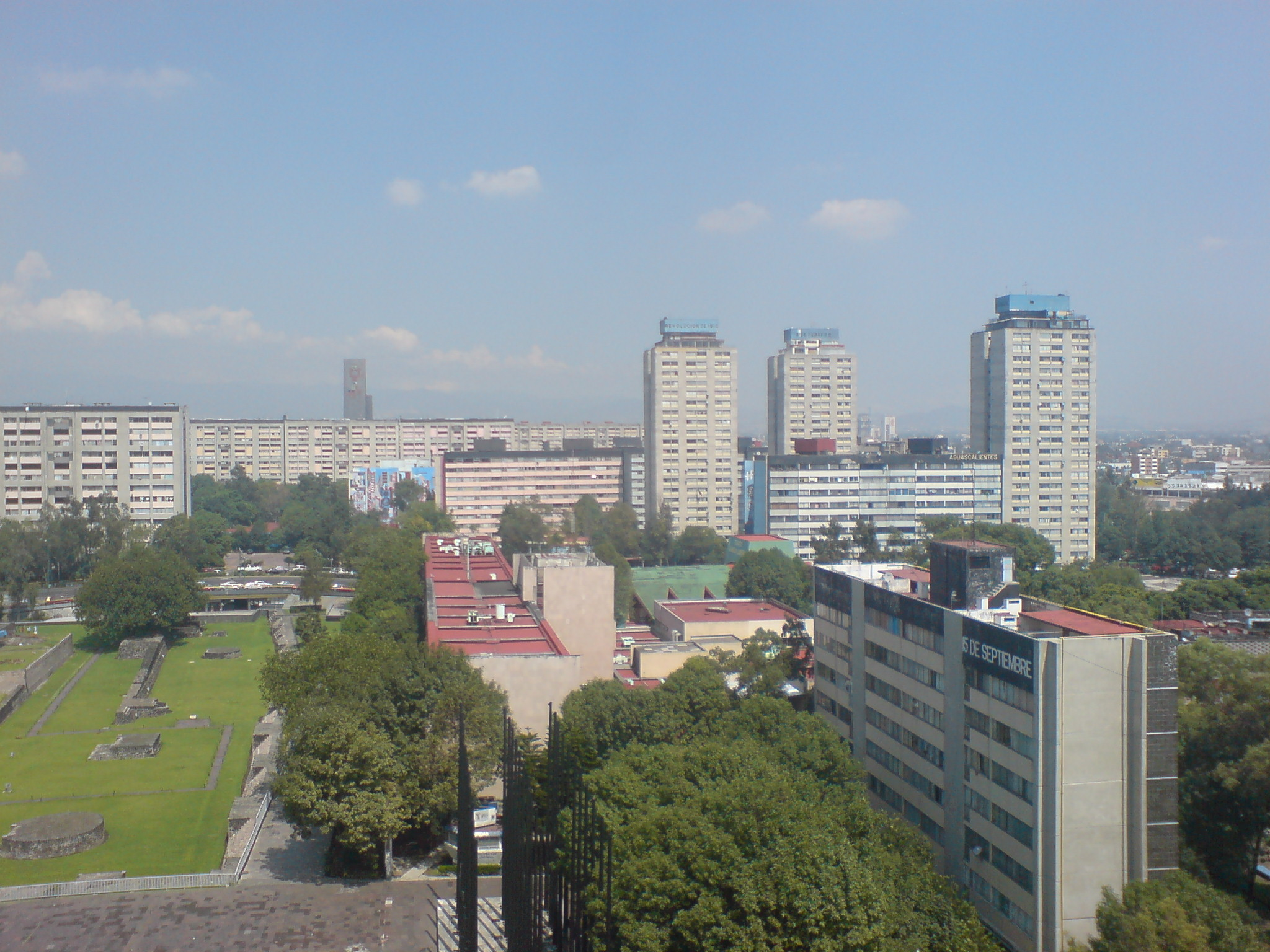

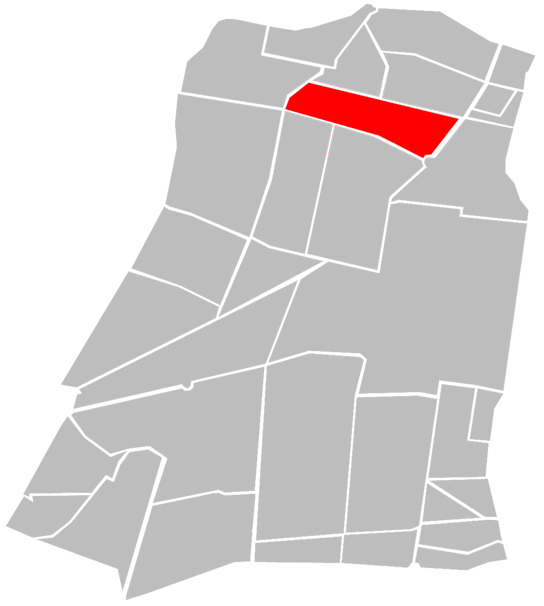
- Location of Nonoalco Tlatelolco (in red) within Cuauhtémoc borough
- Country: Mexico
- City: Mexico City
- Borough: Cuauhtémoc

Area
  - Total: 0.945 km^{2} (0.365 sq mi)

Population (2010)
  - Total: 27,843
- Postal code: 06900

The Conjunto Urbano Nonoalco Tlatelolco (officially Conjunto Urbano Presidente López Mateos) is the largest apartment complex in Mexico, and second largest in North America, after New York's Co-op City. The complex is located in the Cuauhtémoc borough of Mexico City. It was built in the 1960s by architect Mario Pani. Originally, the complex had 102 apartment buildings, with its own schools, hospitals, stores and more, to make it a city within a city. It was also created to be a kind of human habitat and includes artwork such as murals and green spaces such as the Santiago Tlatelolco Garden. Today, the complex is smaller than it was and in a state of deterioration, mostly due to the effects and after effects of the 1985 Mexico City earthquake. This quake caused the immediate collapse of the Nuevo León building with others being demolished in the months afterwards. Further earthquakes in 1993 caused the condemnation of more buildings. In addition to the lost buildings, many residents eventually undersold or abandoned their apartments, as repairs were either never made or made poorly.

Today the complex consists of 90 apartment buildings, divided into three sections bordered by Avenida de los Insurgentes, Eje 1 Poniente Guerrero, Eje Central and Paseo de la Reforma. Originally, the complex was designed to house people from different economic social strata, but today almost all residents are of middle to middle-low income. A major problem is the structural integrity of some of the remaining buildings.

== Construction ==
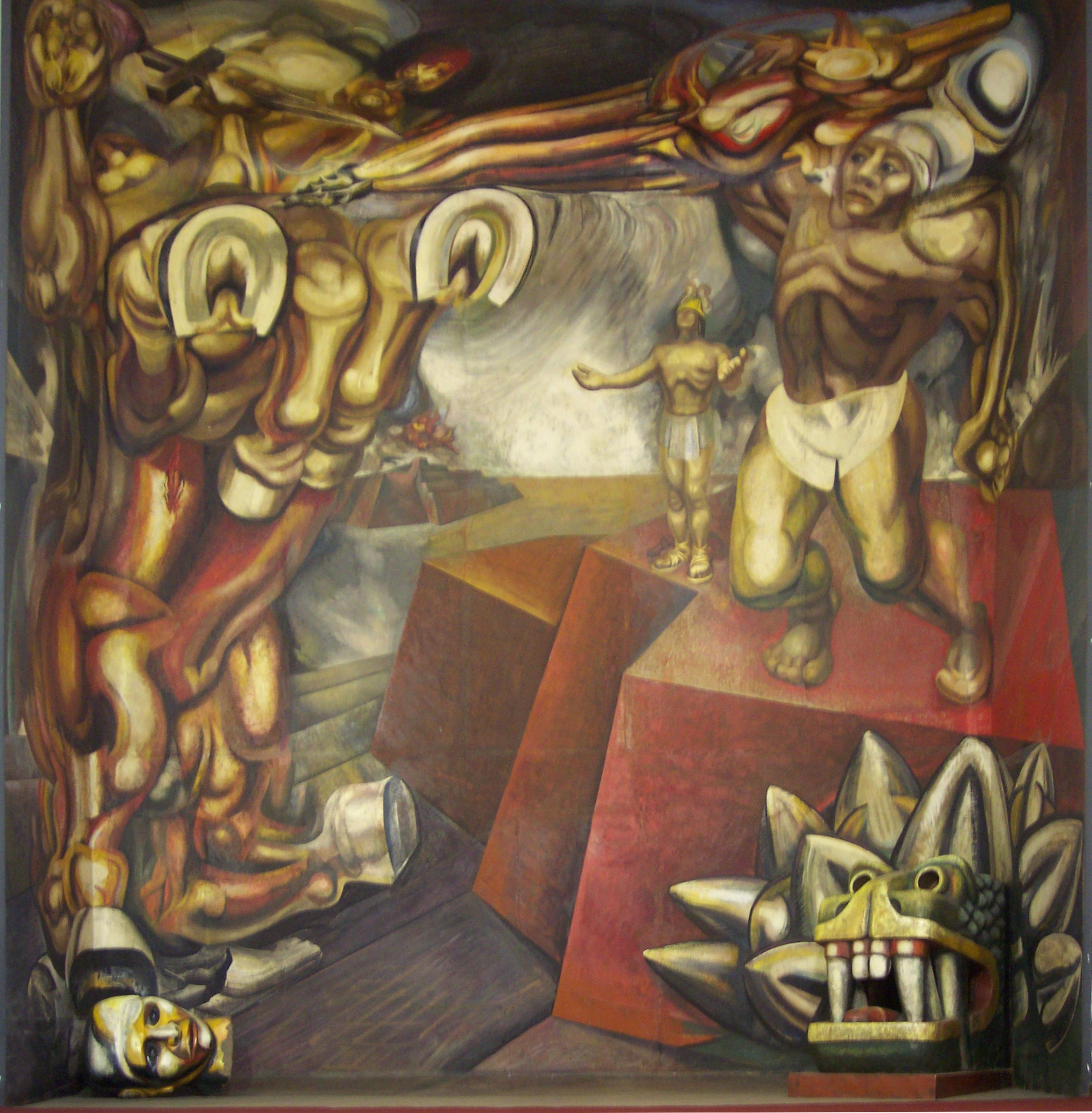
Mural by Siqueiros in the Tecpan building

The complex was ordered built by the administration of President Adolfo López Mateos, between 1960 and 1965, with financing and condominium administration provided by the Banco Nacional Hipotecario, Urbano y de Obras Publicas, S.A. The area has been an urban center since the pre-Hispanic period, when it began as an independent city state on an island in Lake Texcoco. By the time Spaniards arrived, the island had been incorporated into the Aztec Empire centered in the nearby island city of Tenochtitlan. Tlatelolco was famous for its large market, which continued to exist after the Spanish conquest. In the late 19th and early 20th century, the area was a train yard for the Ferrocarriles Nacionales de México. The modern apartment complex was built over the then-abandoned train yard. It surrounds the Plaza de las Tres Culturas, a place that symbolizes the synthesis of Mexico's pre-Hispanic and colonial pasts with the modern day.

This plaza contains the archeological site of Tlatelolco with its ceremonial center, the parish church of Santiago Tlatelolco and the modern buildings that surround them, including a building associated with the Secretaría de Relaciones Exteriores. The project involved a total of 130 buildings over an area of 1,200,000 square metres (13,000,000 ft^{2}), with schools, hospitals, markets, businesses, church and police stations. Its signature building was the Torre Insignia or Torre Banobras. This was built in the form of a triangle or lance point (to resist earthquakes) 127 meters high with 24 floors. It was originally surrounded by gardens and had a large reflective pool. This tower contains the Carrillon Clasico, one of the world's few glockenspiels and the only one in Mexico City. It consists of 47 metallic bells, considered to be the optimal number for four octaves. They were cast in Belgium and weigh 26 tons. The main bells are dedicated to Hidalgo, Morelos, Cuauhtémoc, Madero and López Mateos . A sixth bell is dedicated to relations between Mexico and Belgium.

The complex was divided into three sections. Section one was created for family with limited resources. It aligns with the Torre de Baniobras. Section two was designed for the middle class with Section three, between Eje Central and Paseo de la Reforma, for the wealthy. The complex's main park, twice the size of the Alameda Central, was built in Romantic style. This is known as the Santiago Tlatelolco Garden. Access is through a number of arched entryways, on gray and red stone paths which join in the center. Off the paths are maintained green areas. The garden was built as an integral part of the complex to provide green space. Murals were commissioned for a number of the buildings. The first and most important is located on the Aguascalientes Building, near the Plaza de las Tres Culturas. It contains four panels, one on each side of the building, dealing with the history of Tlatelolco. This was painted by Nicandro Puente. This same artist also created other works here including Tlatelolco, raíz y expresión de México (1998), Homenaje a la mujer (1999) and 1985: Sismo y resurrección (2000) .

The project was awarded to architect Mario Pani (along with Ricardo de Robina) at a time when Mexico and Mexico City was experiencing rapid economic expansion. Born in 1911, Mario Pani was a Mexican architect who mostly grew up in Europe and obtained his degree in architecture from the École des Beaux-Arts in Paris in 1934. After returning to Mexico, he became part of a movement to make Mexico, especially Mexico City, modern, post-Revolution and progressive. Pani's work focused on major residential centers such as large apartment buildings and condominiums. Works like Nonoalco are classified as "supermanzanas" or "super (city) blocks." His work changed the focus of urban housing from horizontal to vertical. His works are marked by being monumental, simple and recurring features. At their height, they were considered to be symbols of Mexican prosperity. Works prior to this included Hotel Reforma (1936), Hotel Plaza (1946), Conservatorio Nacional de Musica (1946), the Escuela Nacional de Maestros (1947), as well the apartment complexes Multifamiliar Alemán (1950) and Multifamiliar Juárez. These were complexes for the working class, integrating parks, artwork (especially murals) and other features in order to create a "habitat."

However, the Unidad Habitacional Nonoalco-Tlatelolco would become his best known work. He created the area as a city within a city, to be autonomous with each block having all the services necessary for residents. The idea was to eliminate the need to leave the area, not even to work. Pani integrated the principles of functionalism as it was conceived and practiced at the end of the 1950s.

== Decline ==
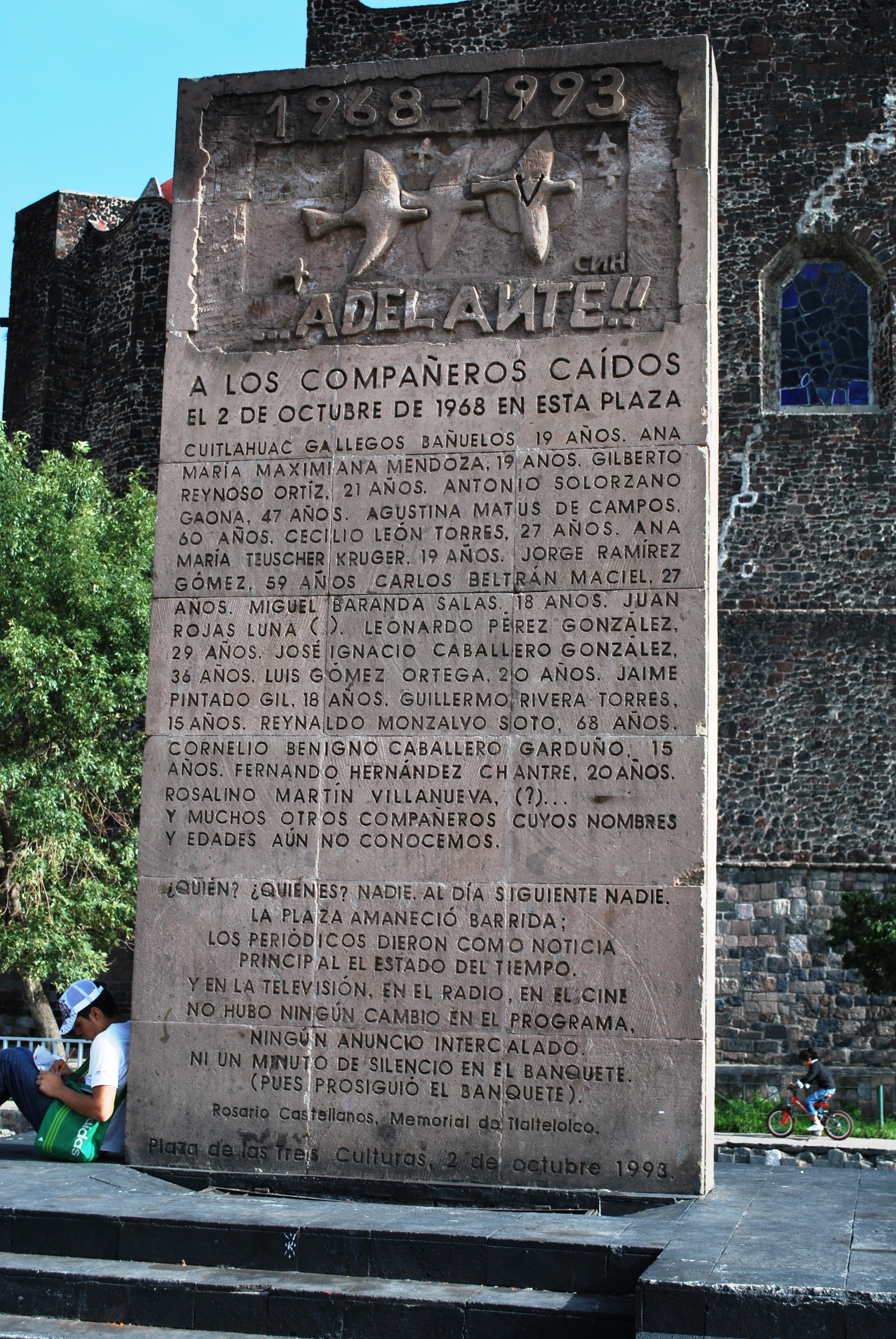
Monument to the Tlatelolco massacre in the Plaza de las Tres Culturas

Quality of life in the area diminished after the Tlatelolco massacre on 2 October 1968, which occurred on the Plaza de las Tres Culturas. The area's only fire station closed during that year and police presence began to diminish, leading to rising crime. The complex suffered damage from two small earthquakes in 1979.

However, deterioration greatly accelerated with the 1985 Mexico City earthquake. Before 19 September 1985, the complex consisted of 102 apartment buildings, seven medical facilities, twenty two schools, and about 500 small businesses serving the 80,000 residents living there. It was still considered the most important complex of its kind in the country.

The complex is located in the Cuauhtémoc borough, which is considered to be a high risk area for earthquake activity most of it lies on former lakebed, with its soft, waterlogged soils. These soils are crisscrossed with small fault lines of their own. These intensify shockwaves that pass through the area from quakes that occurs on Mexico's Pacific coast. Within the borough, Nonoalco-Tlatelolco is one of eleven colonias or neighborhoods considered to be at highest risk. The complex is in a "dynamic amplification" zone, where the shockwaves of a quake over 7 on the Richter scale become strongly amplified.

During the 90 seconds the ground shook on that day, two of the three sections of the Nuevo León building fell with about 500 dead, more than 200 missing and 27 orphans. Other buildings, such as the Yucatán, threatened to collapse that day, but did not. All the buildings suffered damage but along with the collapsed Nuevo León building, buildings such as those called Veracruz, Yucatán and Oaxaca suffered severe damage such as severely cracked foundations. Twelve buildings in the complex were so severely damaged that they were demolished in the next six months. 32 of the buildings were in need of major repairs. Twenty seven were demolished completely. Many remained standing but some of these were too dangerous to occupy at all. The severe damage to this and to the Mulifamiliar Juàrez made for a large percentage of the 3,000 housing units lost on that day. Nonoalco-Tlatelolco was declared a disaster area. What remained of the Nuevo León building and the Campeche building were the first to be demolished. This area would become the Nuevo León Plaza. The reconstruction contract the city government signed promised to return residents to their units in two years. The project lasted until late in the 1990s. Thirty buildings were partially destroyed, removing upper floors. Sixty buildings received minor repairs. Ten were reinforced. The initially budgeted money ran out in six years. Repairs made were shoddy, replacing door, floors and more with inferior materials. Even baths and integrated kitchens which were not damaged were taken out and replaced with inferior ones. Many, who could not afford to wait further, sold their units at bargain prices, often to those politically connected, or just abandoned them altogether, allowing squatters to move in.

Another quake in 1993, caused the demolition of the Atizapán and 20 de Noviembre buildings as well as the two Tecpan towers. The Torre Insignia was abandoned in the same year. Despite repair work being officially declared finished in 1995, buildings were left with large cracks in the wall, loose wiring, half done projects, unhinged door, inoperable elevators and more. This is in spite of the 600 million pesos spent on the effort. In that year, the complex was left with approximately 40,000 inhabitants in 90 buildings and 10,560 apartments.

A number of buildings in the complex were damaged once again by a 6.3 Guerrero-centered quake that passed through Mexico City in 2007.

== The complex today ==
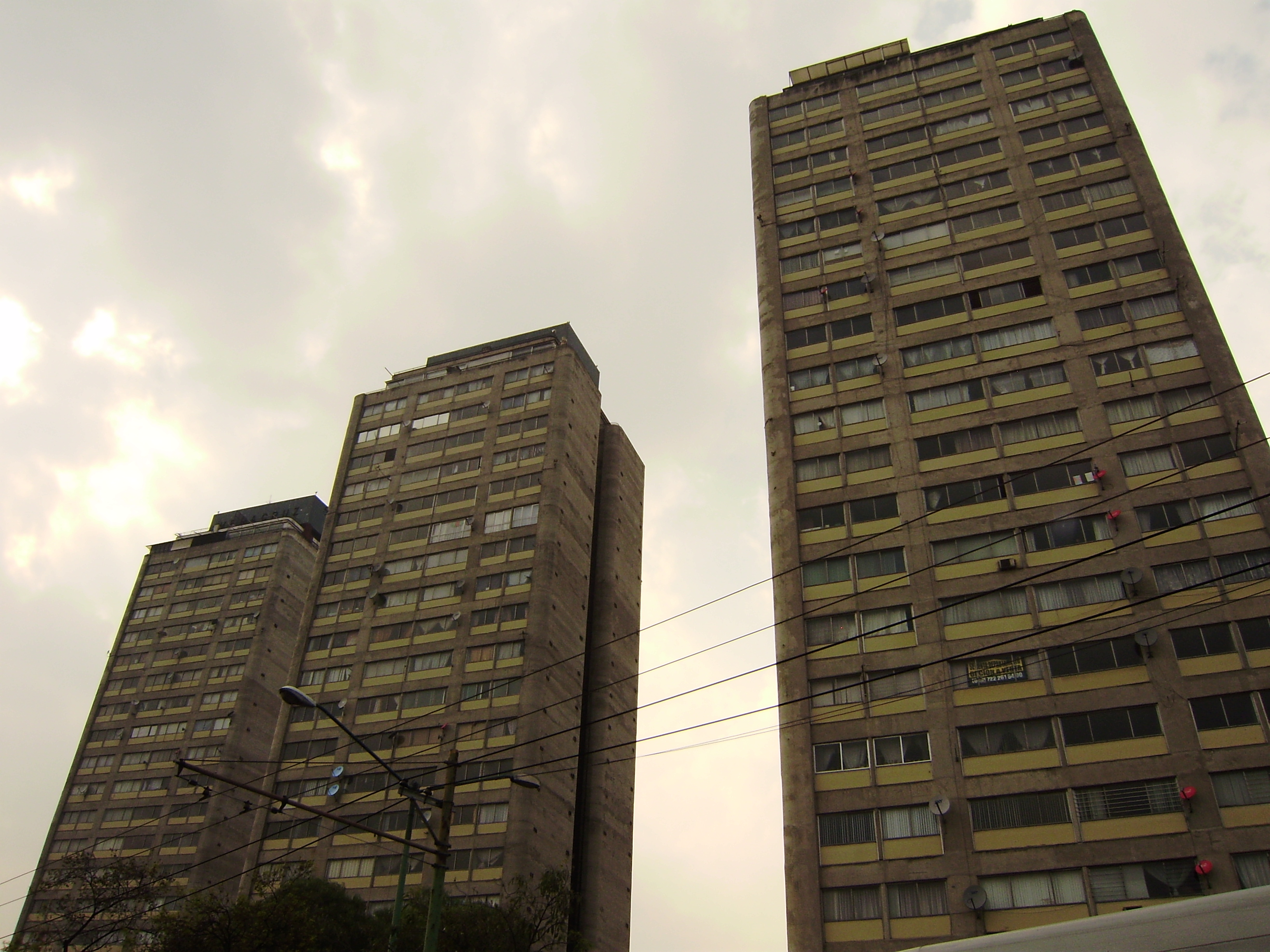
Three of the buildings in the complex

The complex is bounded by Avenida Manuel González, Paseo de la Reforma, Calzada Ricardo Flores Magón and Avenida de los Insurgentes Norte. It occupies approximately 946,000 m2 and remains as the largest vertical apartments complex in Mexico. Currently 55,000 people live there with 40% being senior citizens and retired.

Twenty eight percent of the space is dedicated to green spaces, sidewalks and roadway. Its main road extends from east to west, measuring 2.5 km. There are 22 schools, three health clinics, a hospital, three social clubs, a union office, four movie theaters, a Metro stop, a cultural building of UNAM (which used to be the SRE building) as well as 90 apartment buildings.

Since 1985, a number of preventative measures have been taken in the surviving buildings including inspections and the removal of accessory or decorative features that may be in danger of falling off. However, the deterioration of the area continues. Today, the socioeconomic level of the complex is low or very low income. Many residents blame the government for failing to halt the deterioration. Others also blame residents' failure to identify themselves as part of a community and as owners of or responsible for the complex's common spaces. This is especially true in the parks and other spaces between the buildings.

The two major issues for the complex are crime and the structural risk and maintenance of the area. The complex and surrounding neighborhoods such as Colonia Morelos, Colonia Atlampa, Santa María la Ribera, Colonia Guerrero, Tepito, Colonia Buenavista, and San Simon Tolonahuac and Colonia Peralvillo are all high crime areas, which makes the security a great problem to resolve. The most common infractions are petty robbery, urination in public areas, drugs distribution and public drinking. About three arrests per day are made for these offenses. However, there is not enough police coverage for the complex. The area should have, as a minimum, 30 police assigned to each section, for a total of 90. The 17th Group of Auxiliary Police is assigned to the area, but there are only six security modules with only six police each. Of the six mini police stations there, three are abandoned or used as storage, and the remaining three do not have telephone lines to allow residents to call directly. It is rare to find police on patrol there at night, and police from outside refuse to enter there. This has allowed eleven known gangs to establish a presence, with members from age 12 to 20. These gangs are dedicated to the sale of drugs, muggings and car theft. An area of 200,000 m^{2} suffers an average of six serious crimes per day and the theft of fourteen cars per month. Some of the worst activity occurs in the Chihuahua building. Crime against residents is worst in the common areas, with about half having witnessed or been victim of a crime, usually robbery, both in the streets and in their homes and businesses. Homicide is also common.

Structural problems include the relatively fragile state of the remaining buildings and their susceptibility to further damage. The weight of the complex is causing the subsoil to sink. In addition to the problems remaining from inadequate earthquake repairs, many of the buildings are leaning as well. This has prompted monitoring from both the city government and several universities over the 2000s. Because of fears of further damage, residents of the complex have opposed construction projects such as a vehicular overpass on Ricardo Flores Magón street, and more recently, the construction and operation of Line 3 of the city's Metrobus, which is being constructed in 2010.

In addition to the soundness of the structures, there are problems with homeless and squatters, graffiti, flooding due to lack of pumps, the lack of garbage collection leading to rat infestations and the destruction of parks and other common areas.

== Main buildings ==
- Torre Insignia or Torre Banobras
  127 meters; 25 floors
- Centro Cultural Universitario Tlatelolco-UNAM
  100 meters; 24 floors
- 5 de Febrero
  87 meters; 24 floors
- Chamizal
  87 meters; 24 floors
- Coahuila
  87 meters; 24 floors
- Cuauhtémoc
  87 meters; 24 floors
- Revolución de 1910
  87 meters; 24 floors
- Veracruz
  87 meters; 24 floors
- Zacatecas
  87 meters; 24 floors
- Chihuahua
  58 meters; 15 floors
- Ignacio Allende
  58 meters; 15 floors
- Ignacio Ramírez
  58 meters; 15 floors
- Ignacio Zaragoza
  58 meters; 15 floors
- ISSSTE 10
  58 meters; 15 floors
- ISSSTE 11
  58 meters; 15 floors
- José María Arteaga
  58 meters; 15 floors
- Miguel Hidalgo
  58 meters; 15 floors
- Presidente Juárez
  58 meters; 15 floors
- Tamaulipas
  58 meters; 15 floors

== Buildings which no longer exist ==
1. 20 de Noviembre 87 meters 24 floors
2. Atizapan 87 meters 24 floors
3. Huizachal 87 meters 24 floors
4. Oaxaca 87 meters 24 floors
5. Tecpan (Jalisco) 87 meters 24 floors
6. Tecpan II (Oaxaca) 87 meters 24 floors
7. Churubusco 58 meters 15 floors
8. Guelatao 58 meters 16 floors
9. Nuevo León 58 meters 15 floors
10. Ignacio Comonfort 8 floors
11. Ignacio M. Altamirano 8 floors
12. Jesús Terán 8 floors
13. Ponciano Arriaga 8 floors
