= Manuel Uruchurtu Ramírez =

Mexican politician and lawyer (1872–1912)

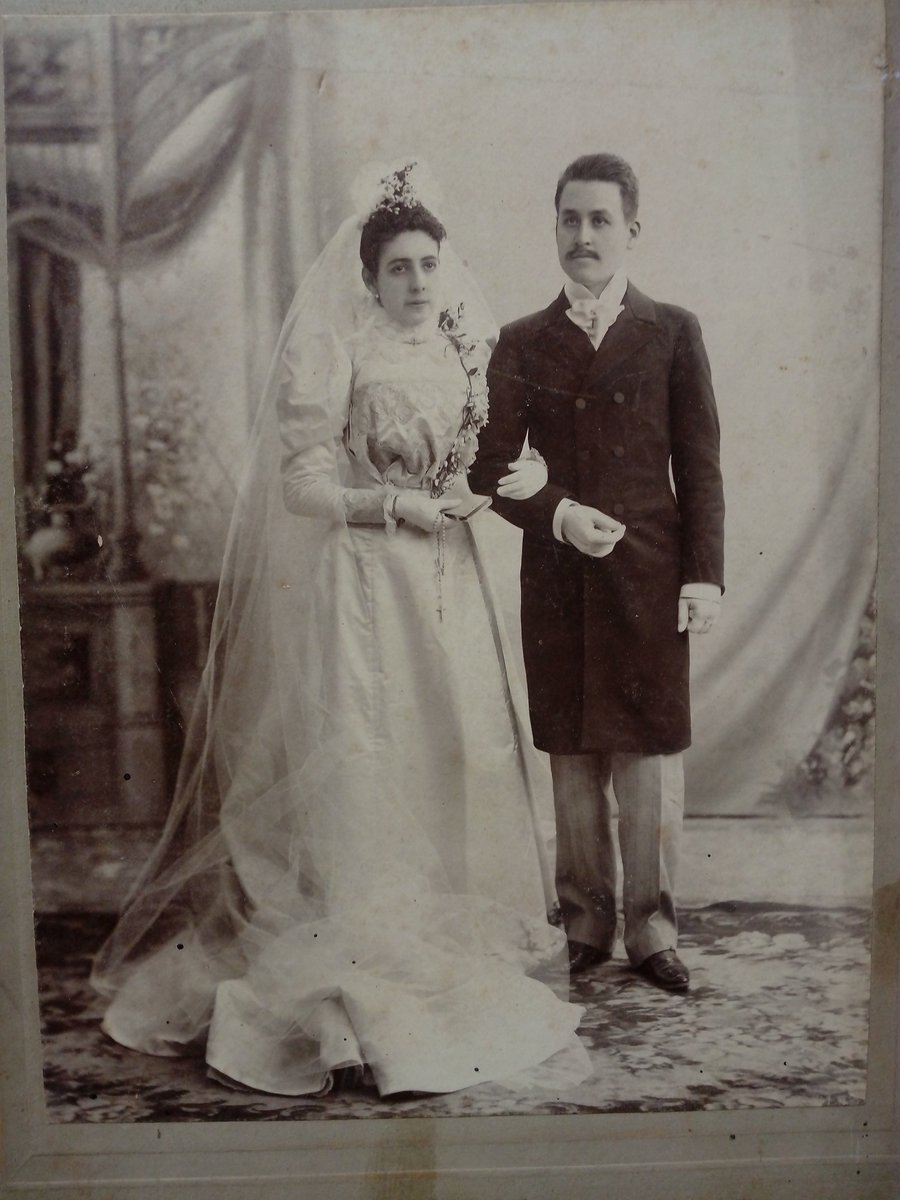

Member of Congress for Sinaloa's 1st
- In office 1910–1912

Personal details
- Born: July 27, 1872 Hermosillo, Sonora, Mexico
- Died: April 15, 1912 (aged 39) North Atlantic
- Cause of death: Sinking of the Titanic
- Spouse: Gertrudis Caraza y Landero
- Children: 7

Manuel Uruchurtu Ramírez (Note: In this Mexican name, the surname is Uruchurtu and the second or maternal family name is Ramírez. He and others also styled his name "Manuel R. Uruchurtu".) (June 27, 1872 – April 15, 1912) was a Mexican lawyer and politician who served in the Chamber of Deputies during the final years of the regime of President Porfirio Díaz. He was the only passenger of his nationality to die in the RMS Titanic disaster.

== Biography ==
A member of an elite family during the Porfiriato (son of Captain Mateo Uruchurtu Díaz and Mercedes Ramírez Estrella), the young Uruchurtu travelled from his home city of Hermosillo, Sonora, to Mexico City to study law. He married a fellow student, the aristocrat Gertrudis Caraza y Landero, with whom he had seven children. He and his family moved to Mexico City. His friendship with the prominent científico Ramón Corral opened the doors to Mexico's political life. In 1908, he was elected to the Chamber of Deputies, representing Sinaloa's 1st district, and he was re-elected to the seat in 1910. His close ties to the regime of Porfirio Díaz forced Uruchurtu, upon the fall of the Díaz government in 1911, to leave the country and take refuge in Europe.

In 1912 he visited his friend and political godfather in France, the also banished Ramón Corral. On March 1, Uruchurtu met with Corral. Upon completion of his assignment, he acquired his ticket to travel on April 10 on the transatlantic liner Paris, from Cherbourg, France, to Veracruz, Mexico.

At the end of March or the beginning of April of that year, Uruchurtu, who was staying at the Hotel París, was visited by Guillermo Obregón, Ramón Corral's son-in-law and president of the Great Commission of the Chamber of Deputies. Obregón had paid a little over £27 for a first-class ticket that would allow him to sail on the luxurious ocean liner RMS Titanic's maiden voyage, but had changed his mind and wished to exchange tickets, to which Uruchurtu agreed; Guillermo Obregón would travel in the Paris and Uruchurtu in the Titanic with the ticket No. P C 17601.

On April 8, Uruchurtu was invited to a party with exiles loyal to Porfirio Díaz and on the 10th of the same month he sent a postcard to his mother in Hermosillo, telling her that the photograph on the postcard was more or less the ship in which he would travel, and that upon arriving in Mexico he would visit her in Hermosillo to tell her about the trip on the famous ship. That same day, in Cherbourg, he boarded the Titanic along with 273 other passengers.

After the wreck of the ship, Uruchurtu's body was never recovered.

== Folk tale ==
During the following decades, an unsubstantiated account of Uruchurtu's final moments became popular in Mexico. The story claimed that on the night of the sinking of the Titanic, Uruchurtu had managed to find a seat on a lifeboat only to give it up in favor of a second-class lady named Elizabeth Ramell Nye (age 29) in a selfless act of chivalry.

Despite the fact that Nye's own detailed account of the events fail to even mention Uruchurtu, the story went unchallenged in Mexico until 2012, when writer Guadalupe Loaeza debunked it while promoting her novel The Gentleman of the Titanic. The fictional nature of the story has also been confirmed by Nye's biographer, David Bryceson, who called the story a "baseless...moving tale".

== Legacy ==
Uruchurtu's family home in Hermosillo, the Casa Uruchurtu, is now the headquarters of the Sonoran History Society (Sociedad Sonorense de Historia). In 2024, the Hermosillo municipal government unveiled an anchor-shaped monument in his memory on the waterfront in Bahía de Kino.

== Publications ==
- Manuel R. Uruchurtu (1984). Apuntes biográficos de don Ramón Corral, 1854–1900 (2nd ed.). Gobierno del Estado de Sonora.
