= Mario Pani =

Mexican architect (1911–1993)

Mario Pani Darqui
- Born: March 29, 1911; Mexico City, Mexico
- Died: February 23, 1993 (aged 81); Mexico City, Mexico
- Education: École nationale supérieure des Beaux-Arts, National Autonomous University of Mexico
- Notable work: University City of the UNAM, Mexico, Unidad Habitacional Nonoalco-Tlatelolco
- Spouse: Margarita Linaae (married)
- Awards: National Prize for Arts and Sciences (Mexico) (1986)

Mario Pani Darqui (March 29, 1911 – February 23, 1993) was a Mexican architect and urbanist. He was one of the most active urbanists under the Mexican Miracle, and gave form to a good part of the urban appearance of Mexico City, with emblematic buildings (nowadays characteristic of Mexico City), such as the main campus of the UNAM, the Unidad Habitacional Nonoalco-Tlatelolco (following Le Corbusier's urban principles), the Normal School of Teachers (Mexico), the National Conservatory of Music and other big housing projects called multifamiliares.

== Early life and education ==
Mario Pani Darqui was born on March 29, 1911, in Mexico City, and moved to Europe in early childhood. His parents were Dolores Darqui and Arturo Pani–Arteaga.

Pani attended the Marist College, a Marist Brothers Catholic school in Genoa, Italy for three years (now Istituto Champagnat, Genoa); followed study at San Carlo College (Collegio San Carlo) in Milan, Italy; and the Lycée Janson-de-Sailly secondary school in Paris for four years. Pani continued his education at the École nationale supérieure des Beaux-Arts in Paris for six years.

== Career ==
In 1938, he began the journal Arquitectura Mexico, which was published until 1979. He introduced the International Style in Mexico, and was the first promoter of big housing Tower block projects. Pani was a great innovator of the urban design of Mexico City, and was involved in the construction of some of its newer parts, developing or participating in the more ambitious and important city-developing plans of the 20th century in Mexico, like Ciudad Satélite (along with Domingo Garcia Ramos and Jose Luis Cuevas), Tlatelolco, the Juárez and Miguel Alemán tower blocks, and the condominium in Paseo de la Reforma, the first of its type in Mexico.

He would found the National College of Architects (Mexico) in 1946.

== Works ==
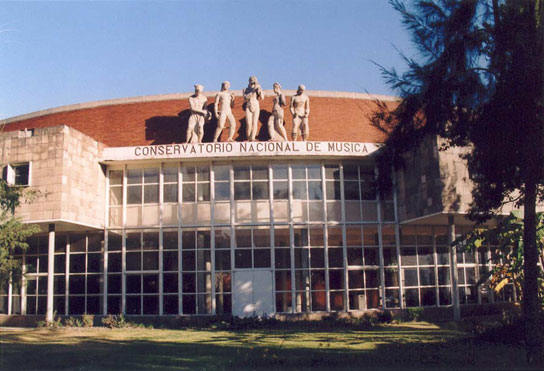
National Conservatory of Music of Mexico

Pani's works include:

- Hotel Reforma (Paseo de la Reforma at Paris street, Mexico City, 1936)
- Escuela Nacional de Maestros (Mexico City, 1945), designed with Enrique Yáñez
- National Conservatory of Music of Mexico (Mexico City, 1946)
- Hotel Plaza, now Secretariat of Urban Development and Housing
- Secretaria de Recursos Hidráulicos (Mexico City, 1946, currently Embassy Suites)
- Centro Urbano Presidente Alemán (Mexico City, 1949)
- Centro Urbano Presidente Juárez (Mexico City, 1950, more than 50% destroyed after the 1985 earthquake)
- Ciudad Universitaria of the UNAM (1950–1953) based on main plan designed by then student Teodoro Gonzalez de Leon
- Ciudad Satélite (1956–1952)
- Insurgentes 300 condiminium (Colonia Roma, Mexico City 1958)
- Torre Insignia (Mexico City, 1962)
- Unidad Habitacional Nonoalco-Tlatelolco (Mexico City, 1964, severely damaged after the 1985 earthquake)
- Port of Entry, Nogales, Sonora
- Reforma 268 (condominium)
- Condominium on Río Guadalquivir between Paseo de la Reforma and Río Volga, Colonia Cuauhtémoc

== Awards and tributes ==
- 1986: National Prize for Arts and Sciences "fine arts"
- On March 29, 2018, Google celebrated his 107th birthday with a Google Doodle.

== See also ==
- Modernist architecture in Mexico

== Gallery ==
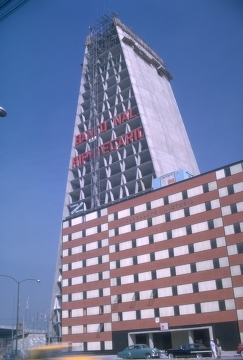
Torre Insignia, a.k.a. Banobras Tower

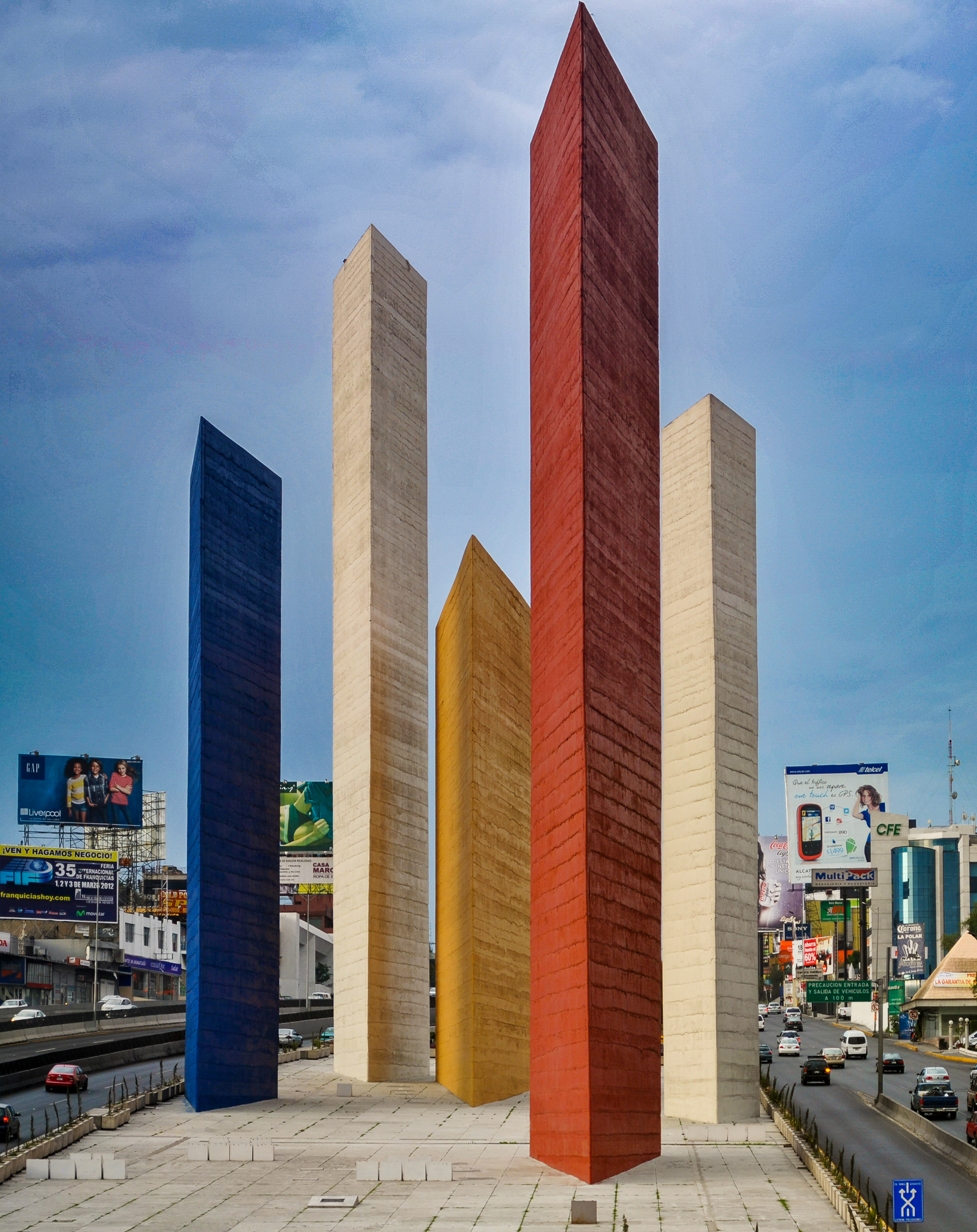
The Torres de Satélite, landmark of Ciudad Satélite, a Mexico City suburb

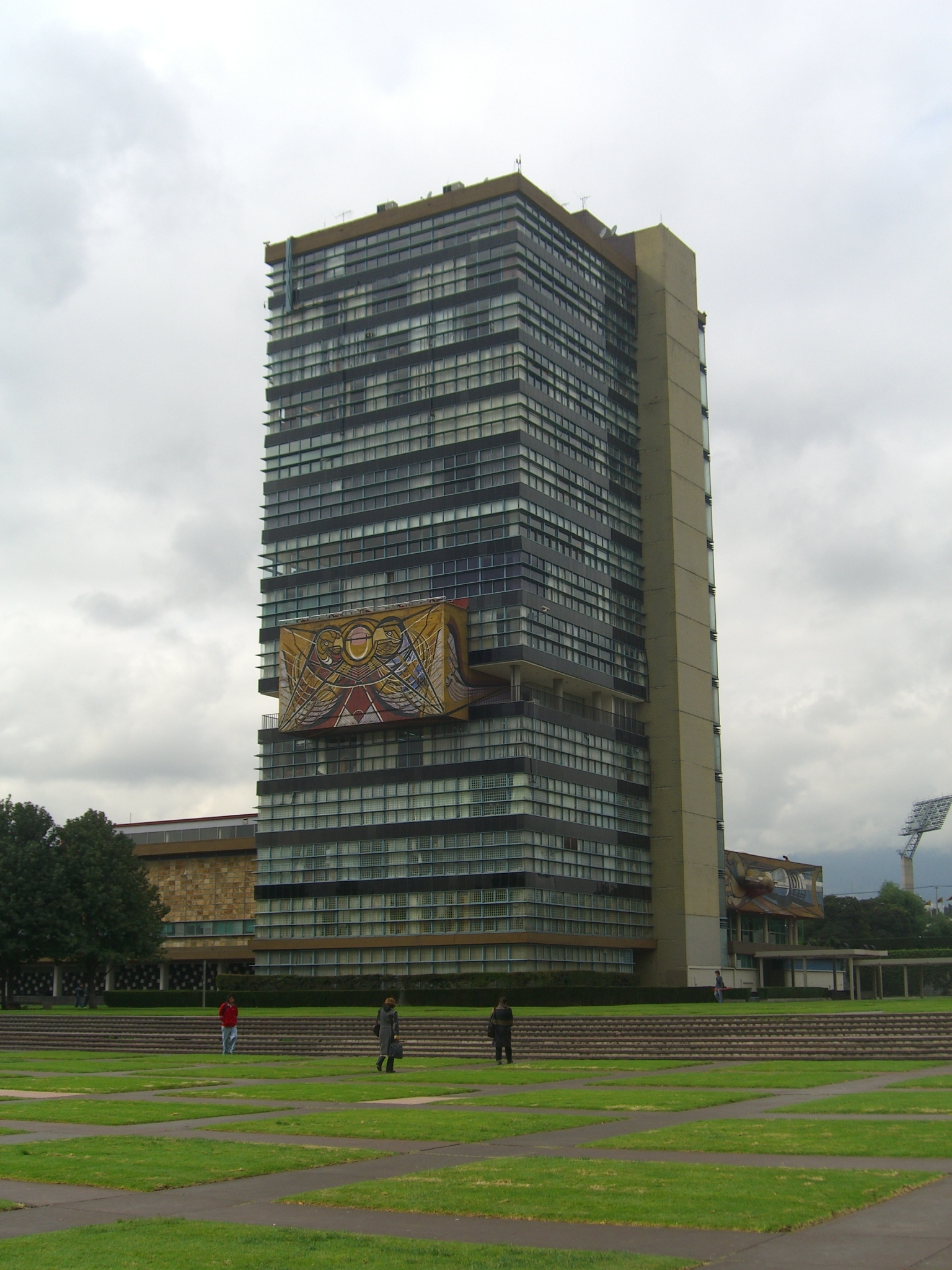
Rectory Tower of the Ciudad Universitaria campus of the National Autonomous University of Mexico (UNAM), Mexico City

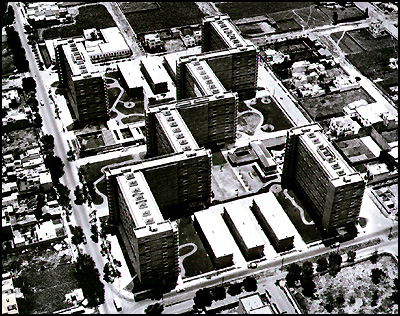
Multifamiliar Miguel Alemán, Mexico City

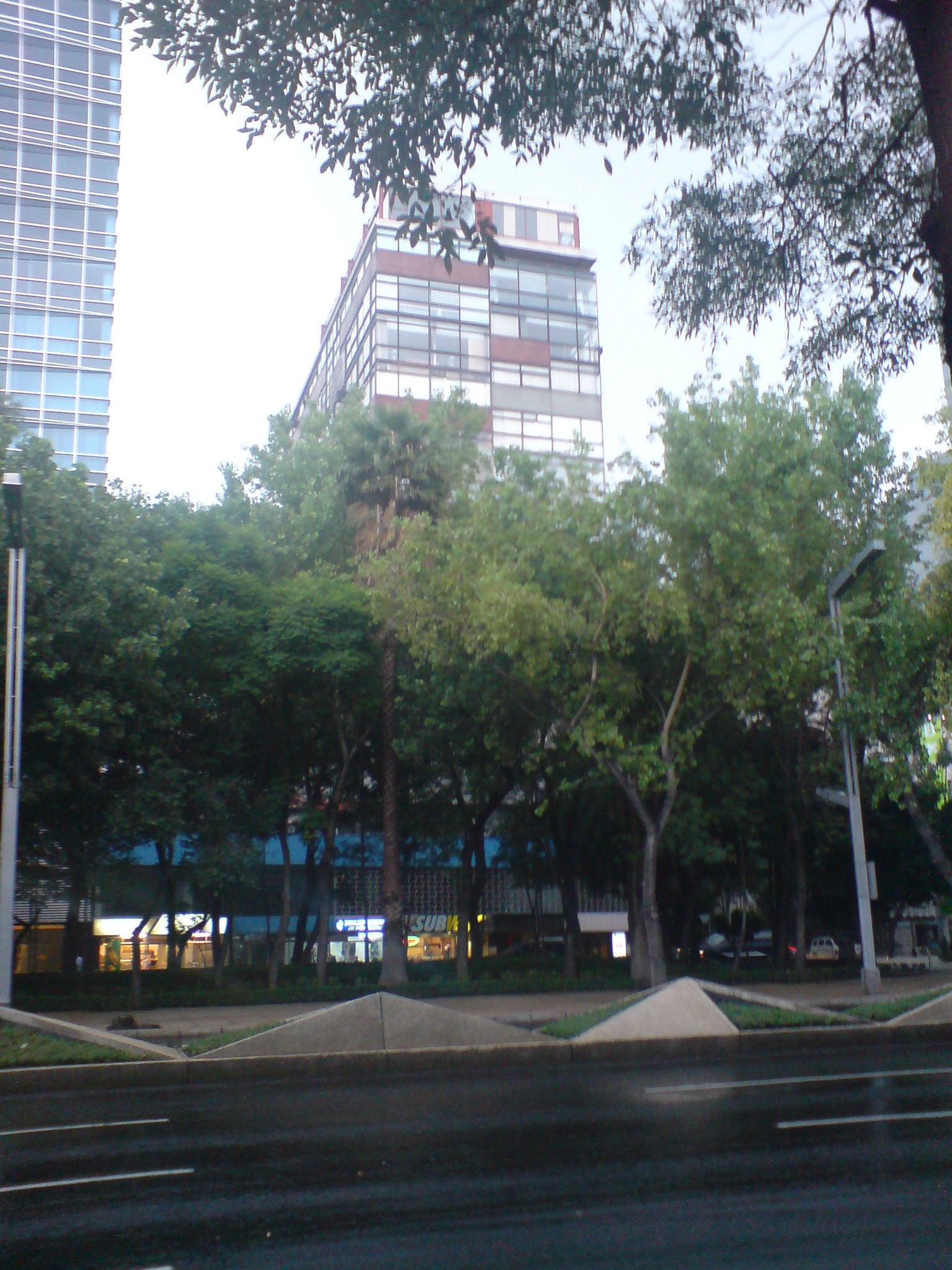
Condominium on Paseo de la Reforma and Ave. Río Guadalquivir, Mexico City

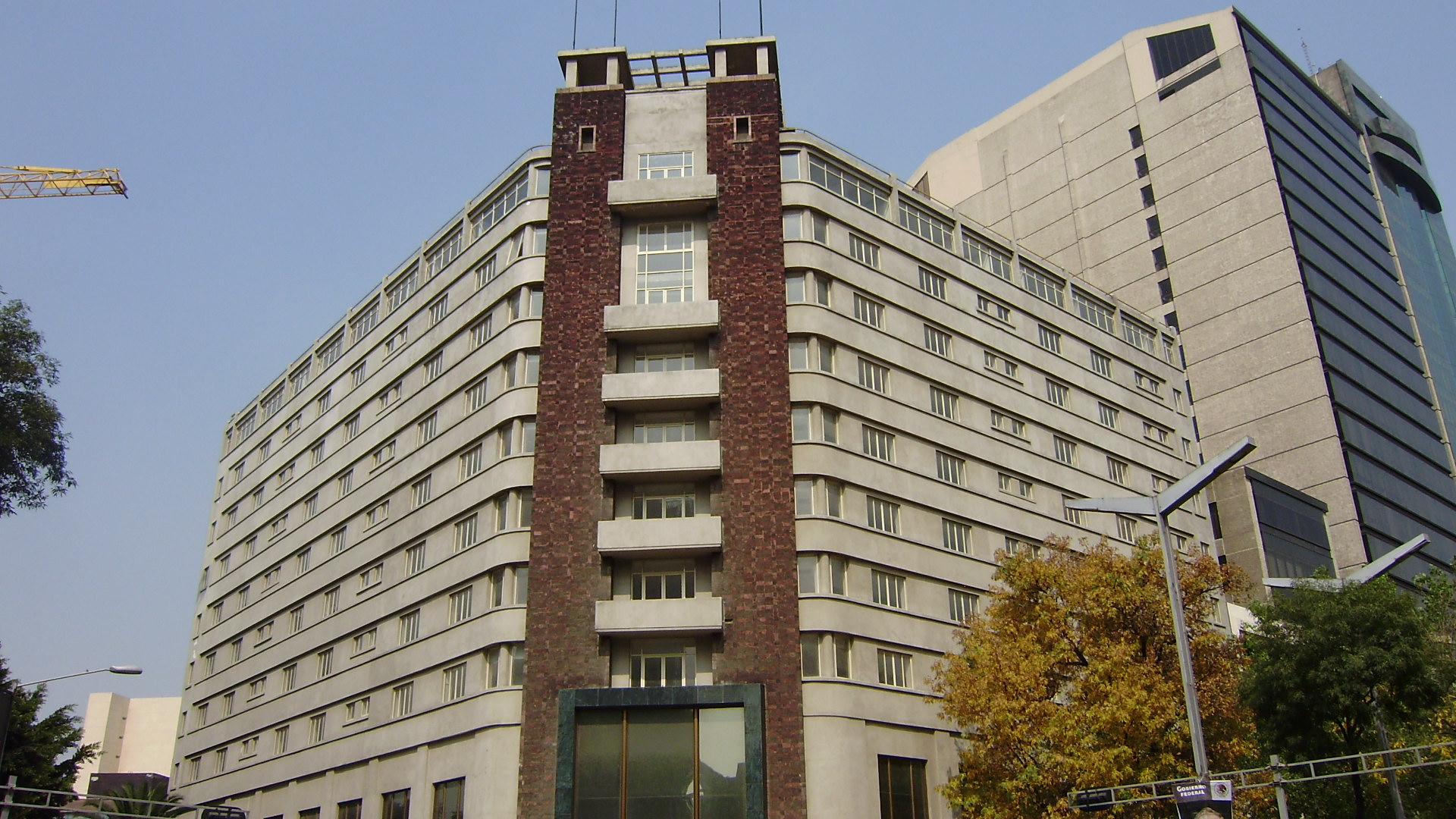
Hotel Reforma, Mexico City (1936)

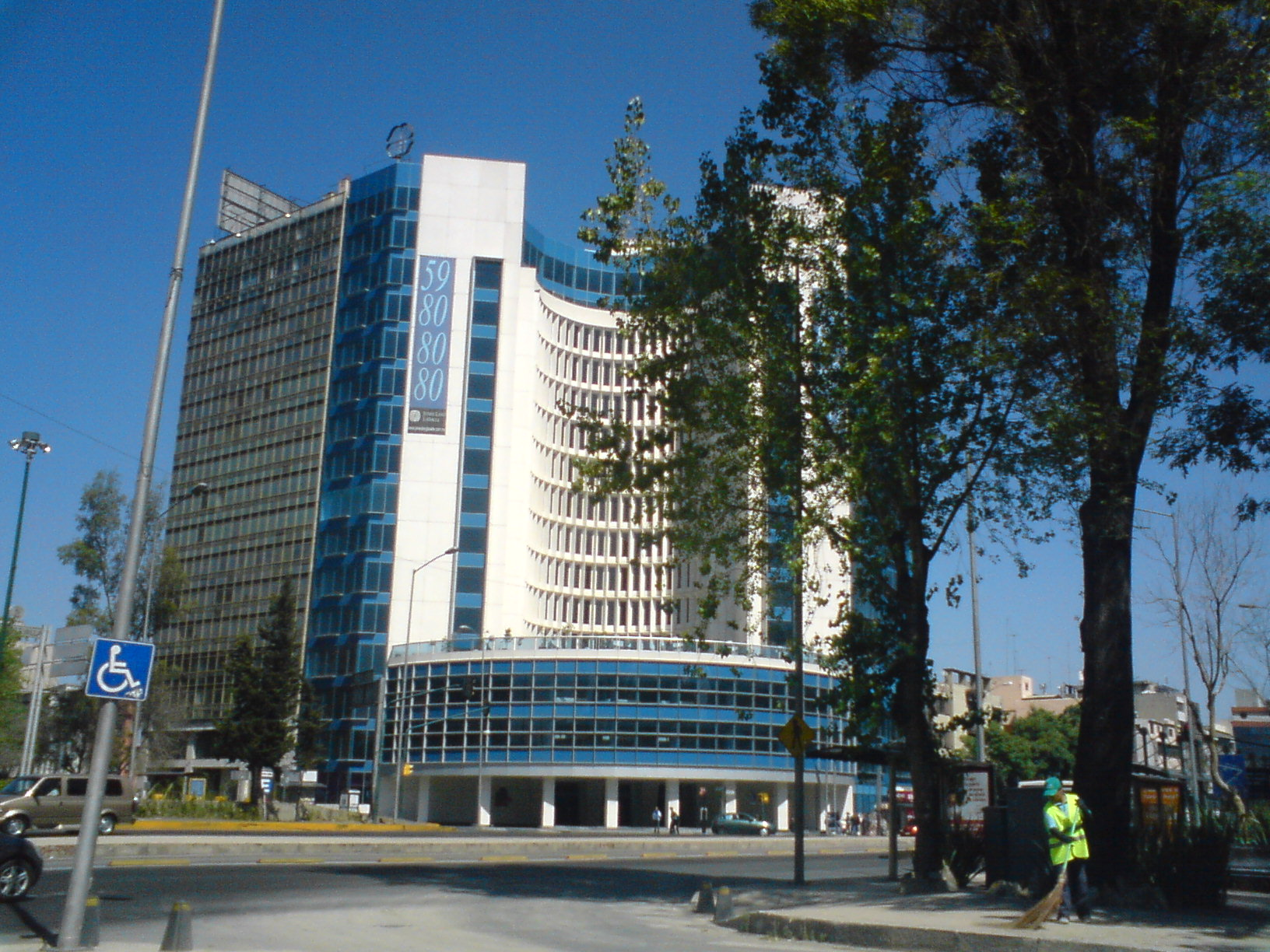
Hotel Plaza (1946), now Secretariat of Urban Development and Housing, Mexico City

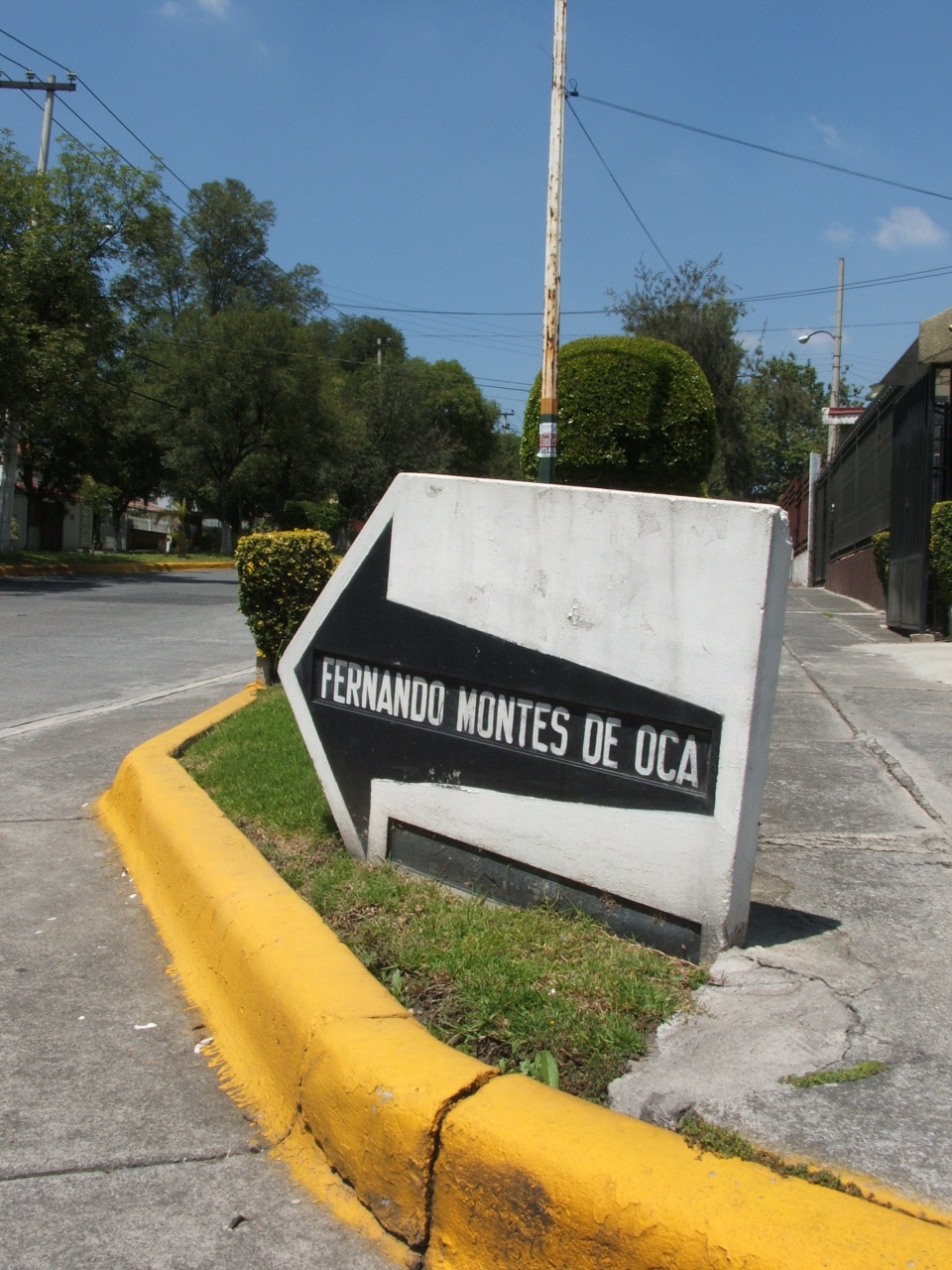
Ciudad Satélite (master plan), Greater Mexico City

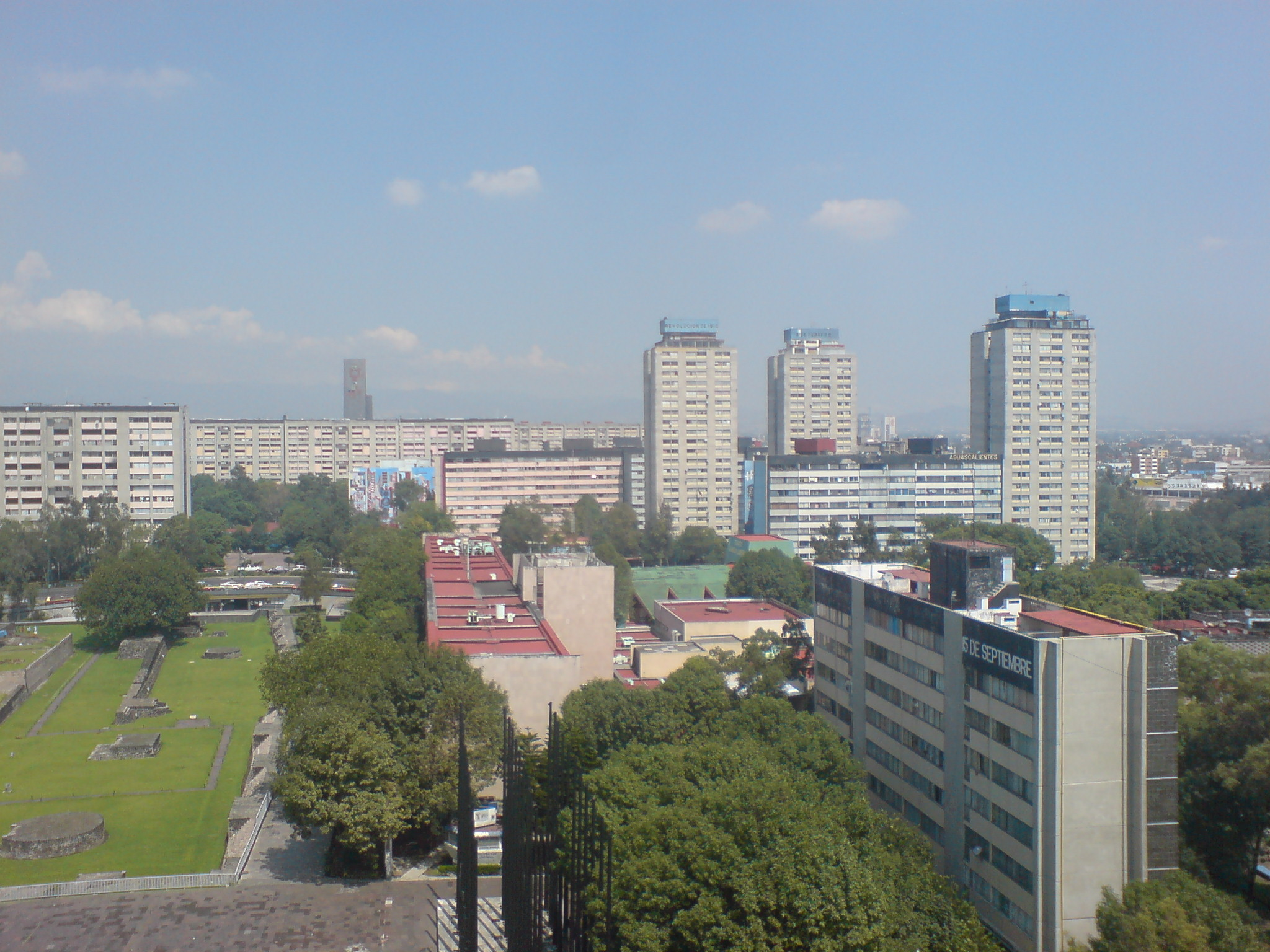
Conjunto Urbano Nonoalco Tlatelolco, Mexico City

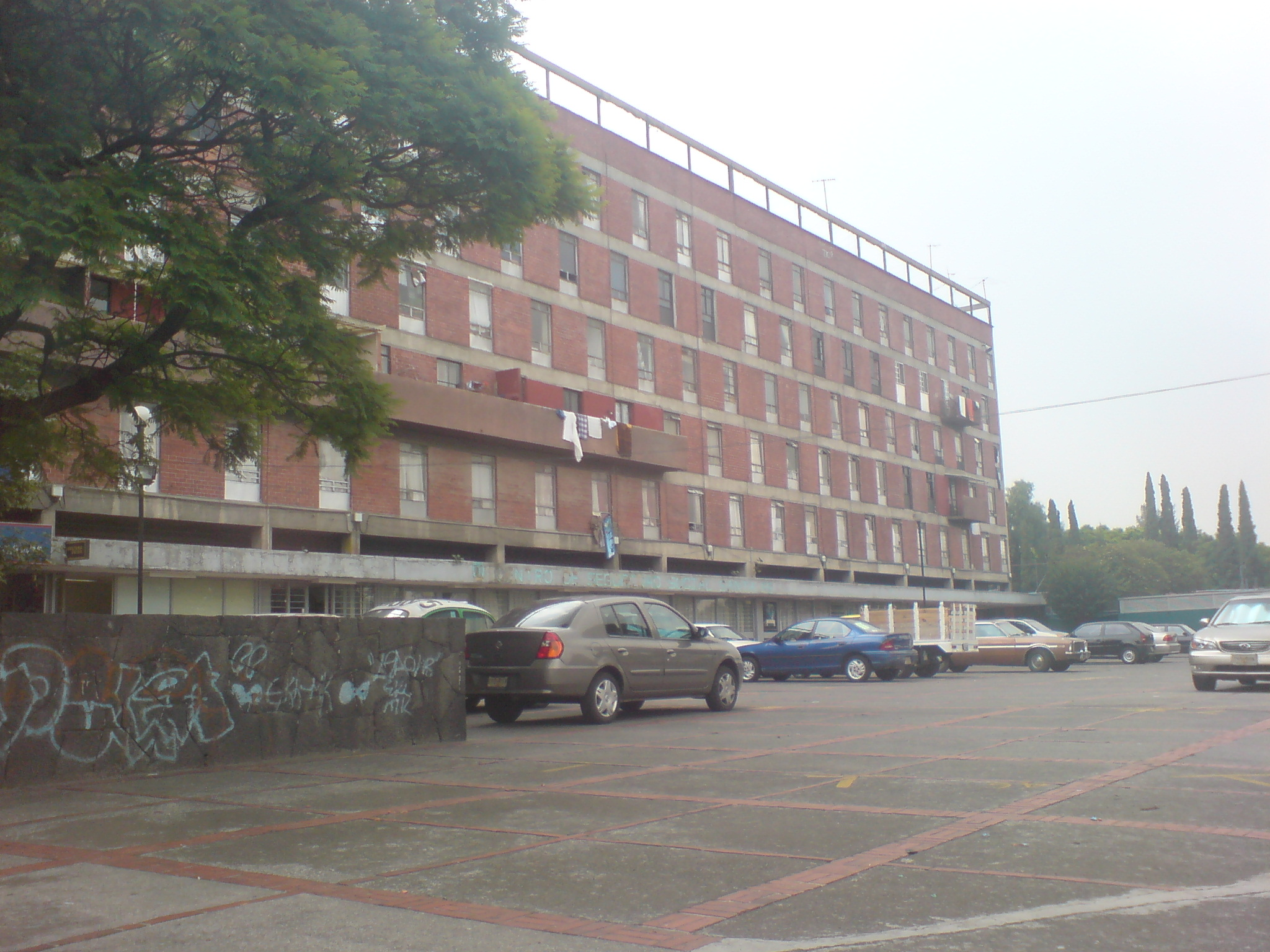
Unidad Habitacional Santa Fé, Mexico City

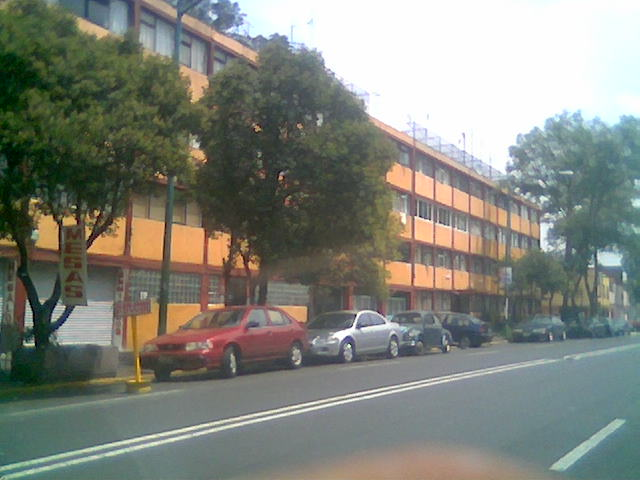
Unidad Habitacional Jamaica, Mexico City

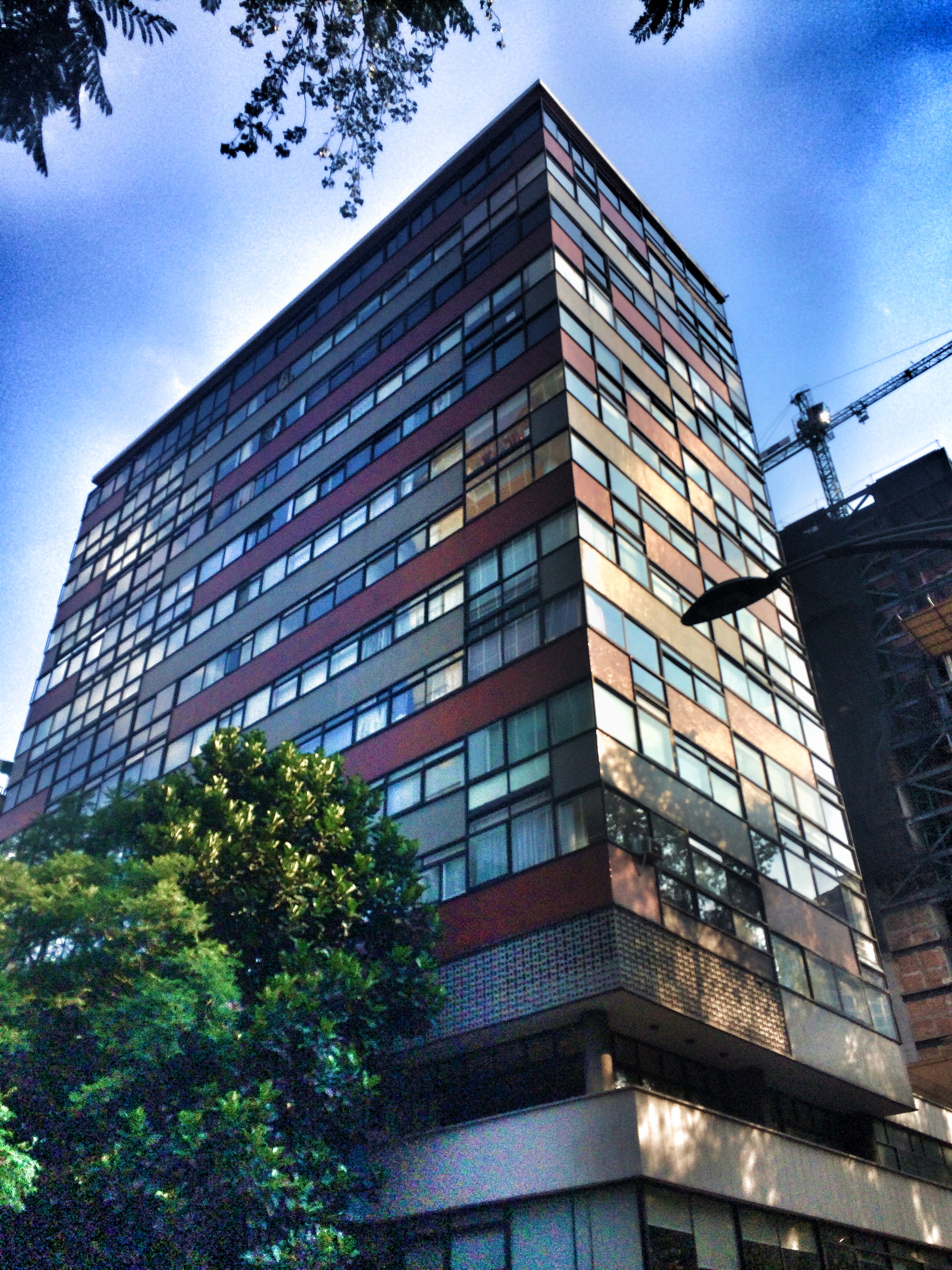
Reforma 368 (1956)

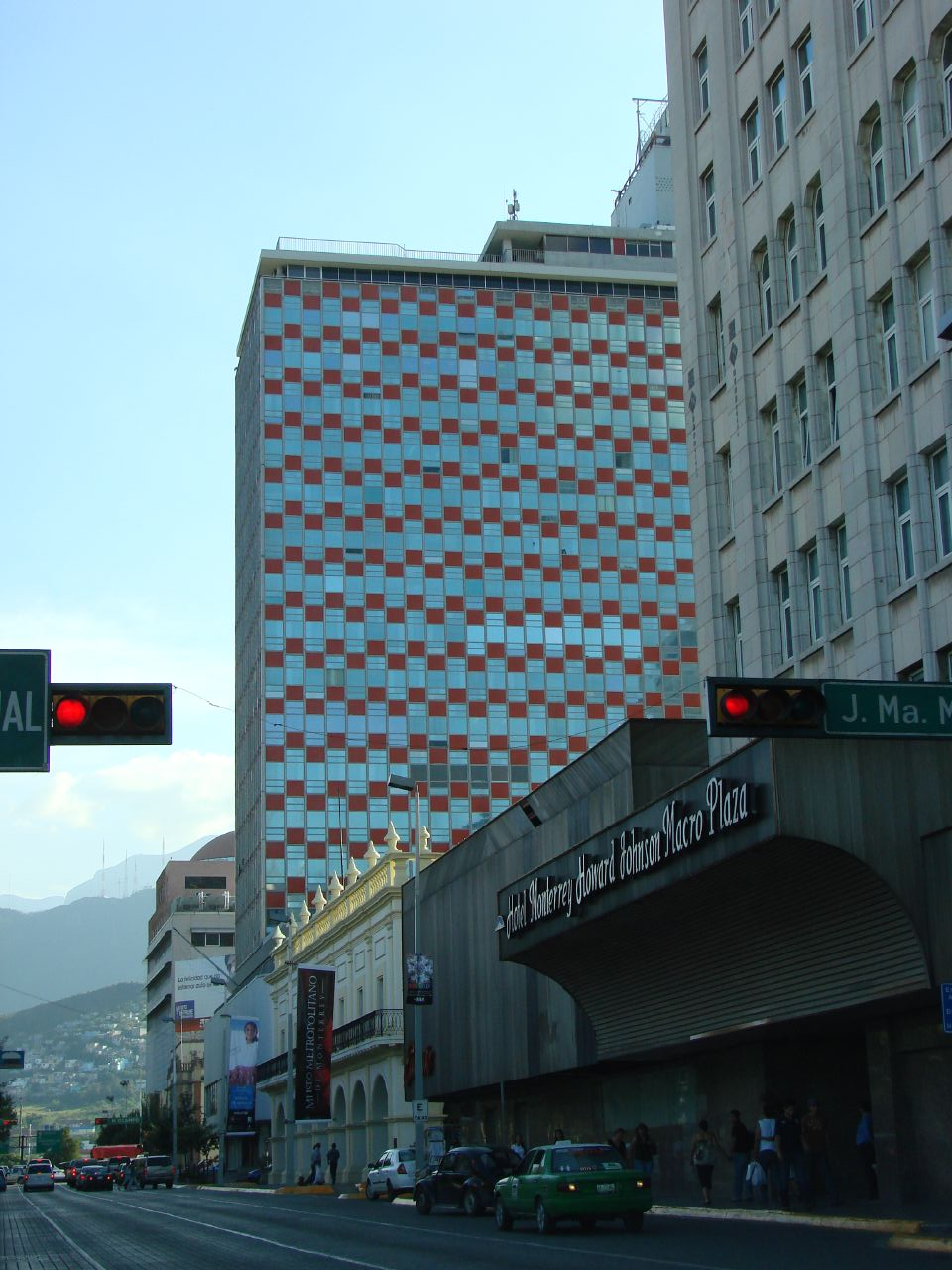
Condominio Acero, Macroplaza, Monterrey

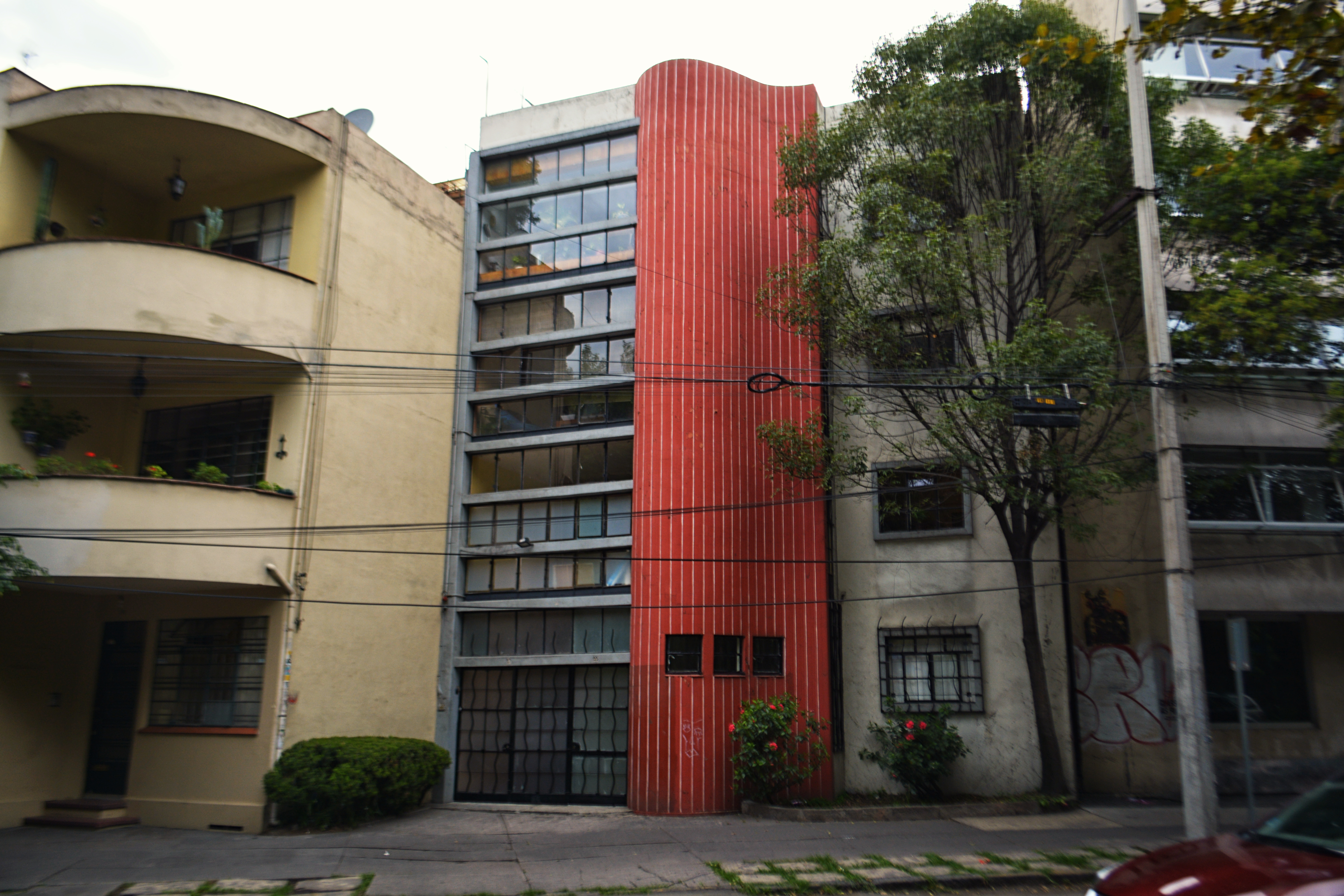
Parque España 55, Colonia Condesa, Mexico City, apartments tower.
