= Day of the Dead =

Mexican multi-day holiday

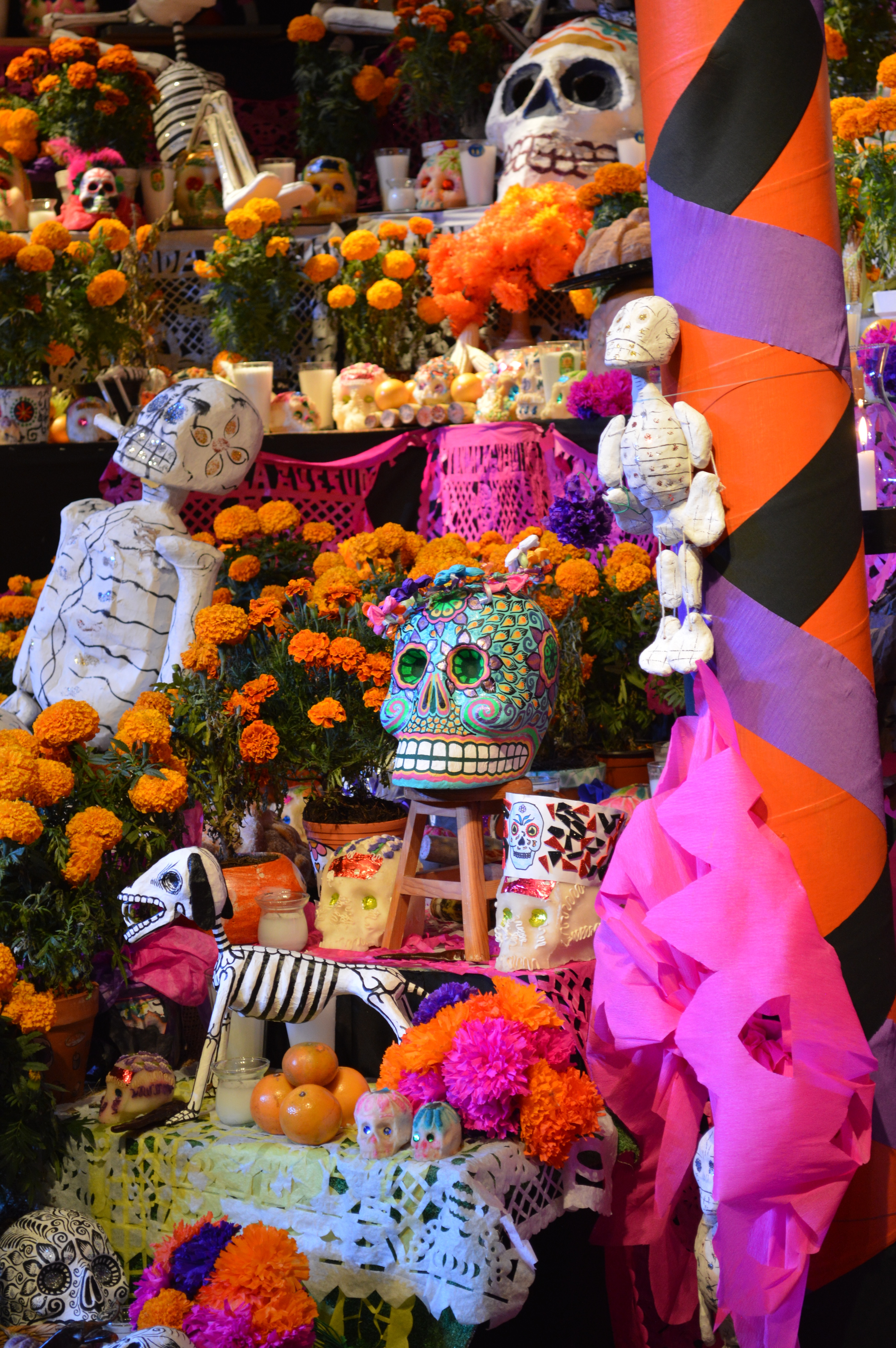
- Cempasúchil, alfeñiques and papel picado used to decorate an altar
- Observed by: Mexico, and regions with large Mexican populations
- Type: Cultural; Christian (with syncretic elements)
- Significance: Prayer and remembrance of friends and family members who have died
- Celebrations: Creation of home altars to remember the dead, traditional dishes for the Day of the Dead
- Begins: November 1
- Ends: November 2
- Date: November 2
- Next time: 2 November 2027
- Duration: 2 days
- Frequency: Annual
- Related to: All Saints' Eve / All Hallows' Eve, All Saints' Day / All Hallows' Day, All Souls' Day

The Day of the Dead (Spanish: Día de (los) Muertos) is a holiday traditionally celebrated on November 1 and 2, though other days, such as October 31 or November 6, may be included depending on the locality. The multi-day holiday involves family and friends gathering to pay respects and remember friends and family members who have died. The celebrations can take a humorous tone, as celebrants remember amusing events and anecdotes about the departed. The festival is widely observed in Mexico and among people of Mexican heritage in other parts of the world. It falls during the Christian period of Allhallowtide. Some argue that there are Indigenous Mexican or ancient Aztec influences that account for the custom, though others see it as a local expression of the Allhallowtide season that was brought to the region by the Spanish; the Day of the Dead has become a way to remember those forebears of Mexican culture.

Traditions connected with the holiday include honoring the deceased using calaveras and marigold flowers known as cempazúchitl, building home altars called ofrendas with the favorite foods and beverages of the departed, and visiting graves with these items as gifts for the deceased. The celebration is not solely focused on the dead, as it is also common to give gifts to friends such as candy sugar skulls, to share traditional pan de muerto with family and friends, and to write light-hearted and often irreverent verses in the form of mock epitaphs dedicated to living friends and acquaintances, a literary form known as calaveras literarias.

== Origins, history, and similarities to other festivities ==
Mexican academics are divided on whether the festivity has genuine indigenous pre-Hispanic roots or whether it is a 20th-century rebranded version of a Spanish tradition developed during the presidency of Lázaro Cárdenas to encourage Mexican nationalism through an "Aztec" identity. The festivity has become a national symbol in recent decades and it is taught in the nation's school system asserting a native origin. In 2008, the tradition was added to the Representative List of the Intangible Cultural Heritage of Humanity by UNESCO, "as practised by the indigenous communities of Mexico".

The Day of the Dead originated in both Indigenous Mesoamerican beliefs and Spanish Catholic traditions. According to some scholars, pre-Columbian civilization, including the Aztecs, engaged in rituals like honoring the deceased, which later became associated with Catholic observance including All Saint's Day and All Soul's Day during the period of colonization.

On the other hand, according to some historians, many of the modern parts of the celebration and the elements are seen as more directly associated with European customs and were modified in Mexico as a means of fostering a sense of national identity.

Overall, the holiday is widely understood despite differing ideas about the celebration. Some see it as a tradition that developed over time. As well as, combining different aspects such as historical elements, cultural, and adding religious elements.

Views differ on whether the festivity has indigenous pre-Hispanic roots, whether it is a more modern adaptation of an existing European tradition, or a combination of both as a manifestation of syncretism. The beginning of the Christian observance of Allhallowtide, including All Saints' Day and its vigil, as well as All Souls' Day, is observed on the same days in places like Spain and Southern Europe, and elsewhere in Christendom. Critics of the Native American origin claim that even though pre-Columbian Mexico had traditions that honored the dead, current depictions of the festivity have more in common with European traditions of Danse macabre and their allegories of life and death personified in the human skeleton to remind of the ephemeral nature of life. Over the past decades, however, Mexican academia has increasingly questioned the validity of this assumption, even going as far as calling it a politically motivated fabrication. Historian Elsa Malvido, researcher for the Mexican Instituto Nacional de Antropología e Historia (INAH, or National Institute of Anthropology and History) and founder of the institute's Taller de Estudios sobre la Muerte (Workshop of Studies on Death), was the first to do so in the context of her wider research into Mexican attitudes to death and disease across the centuries. Malvido completely discards a native or even syncretic origin arguing that the tradition can be fully traced to Medieval Europe. She highlights the existence of similar traditions on the same day, not just in Spain, but in the rest of Catholic Southern Europe and Latin America such as altars for the dead, sweets in the shape of skulls and bread in the shape of bones.

Agustín Sánchez González has a similar view in his article published in the INAH's bi-monthly journal Arqueología Mexicana. González states that, even though the "indigenous" narrative became hegemonic, the spirit of the festivity has far more in common with European traditions of Danse macabre and their allegories of life and death personified in the human skeleton to remind us the ephemeral nature of life. He also highlights that in the 19th-century press there was little mention of the Day of the Dead in the sense that we know it today. All there was were long processions to cemeteries, sometimes ending with drunkenness. Elsa Malvido also points to the recent origin of the tradition of "velar" or staying up all night with the dead. It resulted from the Reform Laws under the presidency of Benito Juárez which forced family pantheons out of Churches and into civil cemeteries, requiring rich families to have servants guard family possessions displayed at altars.

The historian Ricardo Pérez Montfort has further demonstrated how the ideology known as indigenismo became more and more closely linked to post-revolutionary official projects whereas Hispanismo was identified with conservative political stances. This exclusive nationalism began to displace all other cultural perspectives, to the point that in the 1930s the Aztec god Quetzalcoatl was officially promoted by the government as a substitute for the Spanish Three Kings tradition, with a person dressed up as the deity offering gifts to poor children.

In this context, the Day of the Dead began to be officially isolated from the Catholic Church by the leftist government of Lázaro Cárdenas motivated both by "indigenismo" and left-leaning anti-clericalism. Malvido herself goes as far as calling the festivity a "Cardenist invention" whereby the Catholic elements are removed and emphasis is laid on indigenous iconography, the focus on death and what Malvido considers to be the cultural invention according to which Mexicans venerate death. González explains that Mexican nationalism developed diverse cultural expressions with a seal of tradition but which are essentially social constructs which eventually developed ancestral tones. One of these would be the Catholic Día de Muertos which, during the 20th century, appropriated the elements of an ancient pagan rite.

One key element of the re-developed festivity which appears during this time is La Calavera Catrina by Mexican lithographer José Guadalupe Posada. According to González, while Posada is portrayed in current times as the "restorer" of Mexico's pre-Hispanic tradition, he was never interested in Native American culture or history. Posada was predominantly interested in drawing scary images which are far closer to those of the European renaissance or the horrors painted by Francisco de Goya in the Spanish War of Independence against Napoleon than to the Mexica tzompantli. The recent trans-Atlantic connection can also be observed in the pervasive use of couplet in allegories of death and the play Don Juan Tenorio by 19th-century Spanish writer José Zorrilla which is represented on this date both in Spain and in Mexico since the early 19th century due to its ghostly apparitions and cemetery scenes.

Opposing views assert that despite the obvious European influence and clear adoption of symbols and traditions as well as co-option of dates and seasons, there exists some proof of pre-Columbian festivities that were similar in spirit if not substance, with the Aztec people having at least six celebrations during the year that were similar to Day of the Dead, the closest one being Quecholli, a celebration that honored Mixcóatl (the god of war) and was celebrated between October 20 and November 8. This celebration included elements such as the placement of altars with food (tamales) near the burying grounds of warriors to help them in their journey to the afterlife. Influential Mexican poet and Nobel prize laureate Octavio Paz strongly supported the syncretic view of the Día de Muertos tradition being a continuity of ancient Aztec festivals celebrating death, as is most evident in the chapter "All Saints, Day of the Dead" of his 1950 book-length essay The Labyrinth of Solitude.

Ruben C. Cordova emphasizes the zeal with which the Spanish attempted to extinguish indigenous religious beliefs and practices, such that it is often difficult to reconstruct their main features. Over time, indigenous converts became extremely devout Catholics. As Mexico modernized, the traditional practices that the Spanish had brought to the Americas survived most robustly in rural and less affluent communities, which had high concentrations of indigenous and mestizo populations. Thus archaic Spanish religious practices in marginal areas came to be mistakenly regarded as the "pure" core of primarily "indigenous" Day of the Dead festivities.

The Aztecs devoted two twenty-day months in their ritual calendar to the dead: the ninth and tenth months, which were for children and adults, respectively. Cordova argues that some recollection of these festivals "was compressed down to two days and cryptically celebrated within the Catholic liturgical calendar", which is why, in Mexico, "unlike other Latin American countries with Day of the Dead traditions — All Saints' Day is dedicated to children, and All Souls' Day is dedicated to adults."

He also notes that the same object, such as a stone skull carved by the Aztecs, would have different meanings in different religious contexts. For the Aztecs, bones—and skulls in particular—were reservoirs of enormous sacred power. A stone skull could evoke sacrifice, and the skull racks where the skulls of sacrificed captives were displayed. The Spanish could take an Aztec skull and repurpose it by placing it on a holy water font, or under a cross in a cemetery, whereby it would be transformed into a memento mori.

Regardless of its origin, the festivity has become a national symbol in Mexico and as such is taught in the nation's school system, typically asserting a native origin. It is also a school holiday nationwide.

== Observance in Mexico ==
=== Altars and installations in Mexico City museums and public spaces ===
The Day of the Dead has a cultural importance as a practice of the relationship between the living and the dead. Unlike grieving centred traditions, the holiday is characterised by remembrance activities that emphasise celebration and collective memory. Additionally, families and communities gather to honour deceased relatives through shared rituals, storytelling, and symbolic offerings.

Death is viewed as a necessary component of life rather than an ending in their cultural views. According to research, these behaviours strengthen social links among families and communities and aid in the generational transfer of cultural values. Internationally, the holiday is recognised by its cultural significance as UNESCO has included it in the Intangible Cultural Heritage of Humanity.

A number of Mexico City's museums and public spaces have played an important part in developing and promoting urban Day of the Dead traditions through altars and installations. These notable organizations include: Anahuacalli, the Frida Kahlo Museum, the Museum of Popular Cultures, the Dolores Olmedo Museum, the Museum of the First Printing Press in the Americas, and the Cloister of Sor Juana. From turn of the millennium until the imposition of the modern Day of the Dead parade, remarkable large-scale installations were created on the Zócalo, Mexico City's central square.

=== Altars (ofrendas) ===
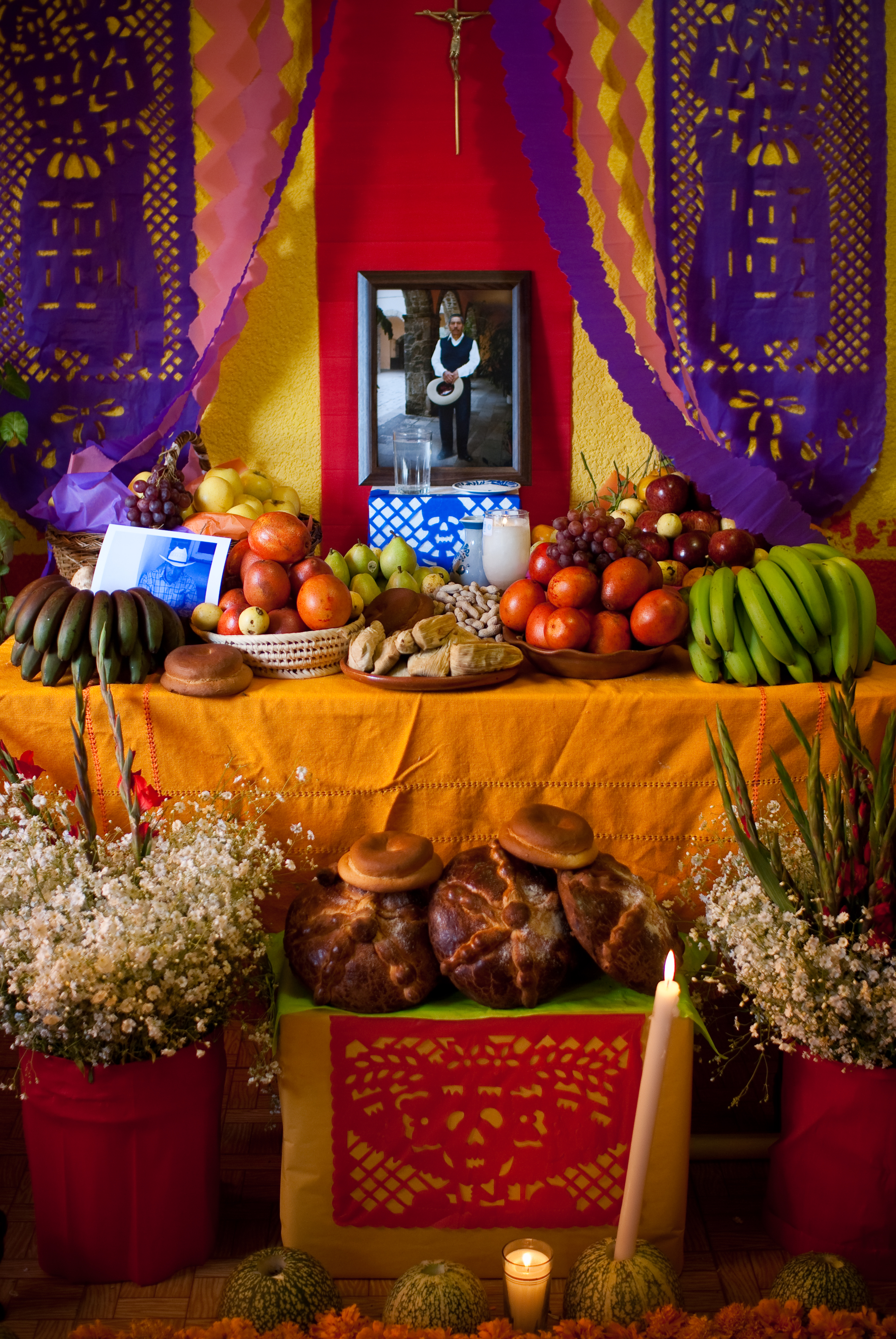
Día de Muertos altar commemorating a deceased man in Milpa Alta, Mexico City

During Día de Muertos, the tradition is to build private altars ("ofrendas") containing the favorite foods and beverages, as well as photos and memorabilia, of the departed. The intent is to encourage visits by the souls, so the souls will hear the prayers and the words of the living directed to them. These altars are often placed at home or in public spaces such as schools and libraries, but it is also common for people to go to cemeteries to place these altars next to the tombs of the departed.

Plans for the day are made throughout the year, including gathering the goods to be offered to the dead. During the three-day period families usually clean and decorate graves; most visit the cemeteries where their loved ones are buried and decorate their graves with ofrendas (altars), which often include orange Mexican marigolds (Tagetes erecta) called cempasúchil (originally named cempōhualxōchitl, Nāhuatl for 'twenty flowers'). In modern Mexico the marigold is sometimes called Flor de Muerto ('Flower of Dead'). These flowers are thought to attract souls of the dead to the offerings. It is also believed the bright petals with a strong scent can guide the souls from cemeteries to their family homes. The common name in English, marigold, is derived from Mary's gold, a name first applied to a similar plant native to Europe, Calendula officinalis.

Toys are brought for dead children (los angelitos, or 'the little angels'), and bottles of tequila, mezcal or pulque or jars of atole for adults. Families will also offer trinkets or the deceased's favorite candies on the grave. Some families have ofrendas in homes, usually with foods such as candied pumpkin, pan de muerto ('bread of dead'), and sugar skulls; and beverages such as atole. The ofrendas are left out in the homes as a welcoming gesture for the deceased. Some people believe the spirits of the dead eat the "spiritual essence" of the ofrendas' food, so though the celebrators eat the food after the festivities, they believe it lacks nutritional value. Pillows and blankets are left out so the deceased can rest after their long journey. In some parts of Mexico, such as the towns of Mixquic, Pátzcuaro and Janitzio, people spend all night beside the graves of their relatives. In many places, people have picnics at the grave site, as well.

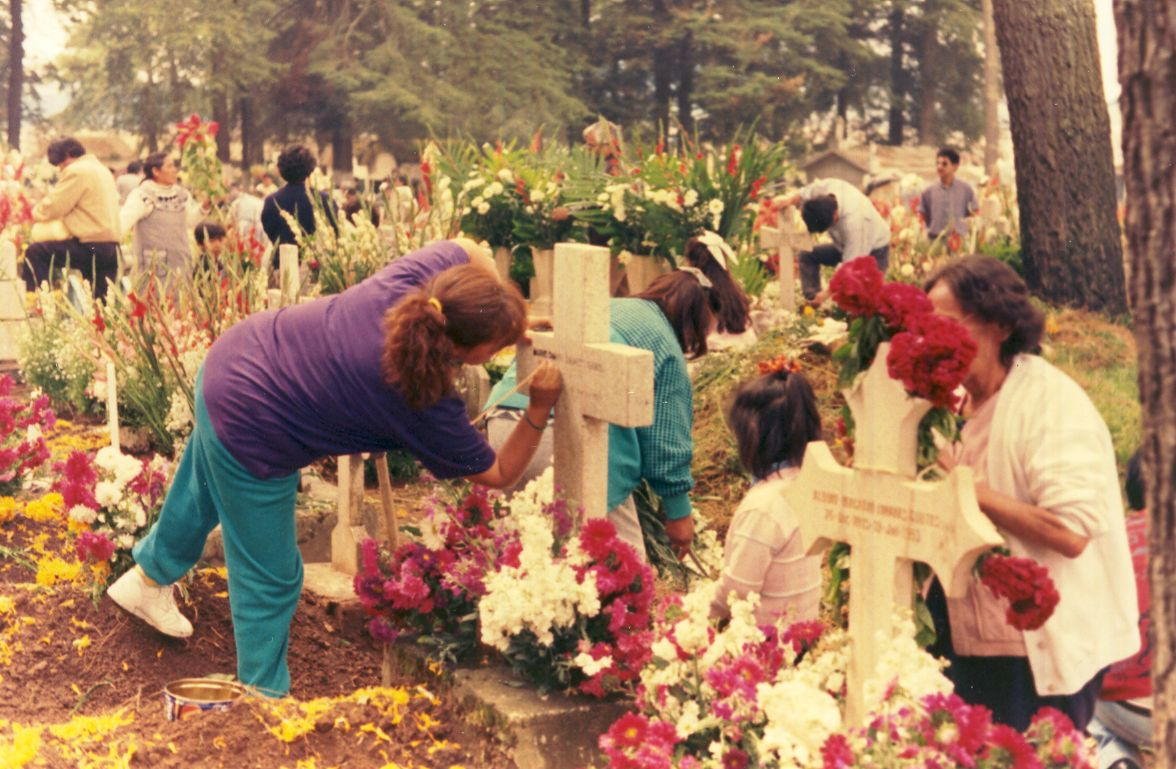
Families tidying and decorating graves at a cemetery in Almoloya del Río in the State of Mexico, 1995

Some families build altars or small shrines in their homes; these sometimes feature a Christian cross, statues or pictures of the Blessed Virgin Mary, pictures of deceased relatives and other people, scores of candles, and an ofrenda. Traditionally, families spend some time around the altar, praying and telling anecdotes about the deceased. In some locations, celebrants wear shells on their clothing, so when they dance, the noise will wake up the dead; some will also dress up as the deceased.

==== Food ====
During Day of the Dead festivities, food is both eaten by living people and given to the spirits of their departed ancestors as ofrendas ('offerings'). Tamales are one of the most common dishes prepared for this day for both purposes.

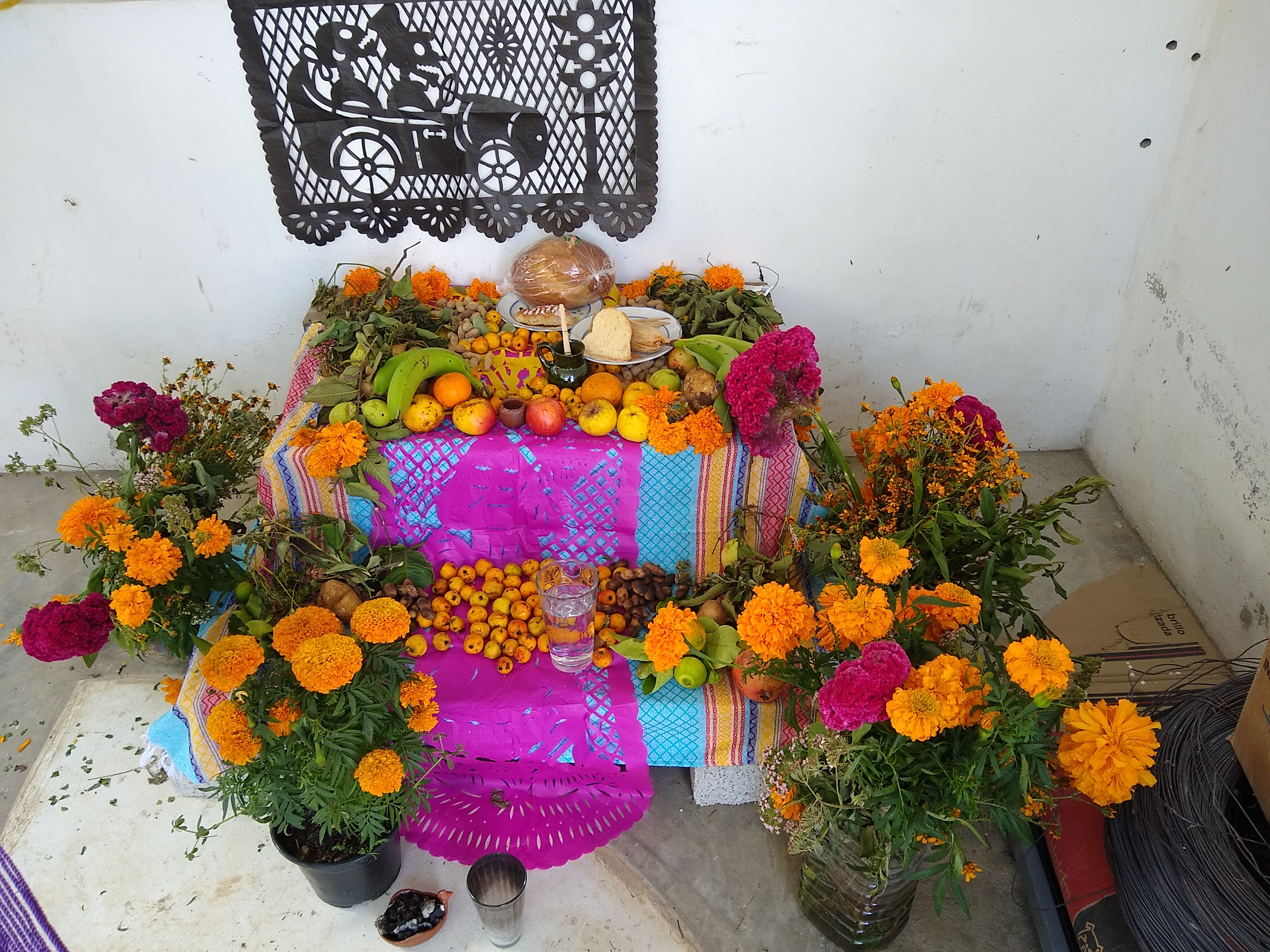
Family altar for the Day of the Dead on a patio

Pan de muerto and calaveras are associated specifically with Day of the Dead. Pan de muerto is a type of sweet roll shaped like a bun, topped with sugar, and often decorated with bone-shaped pieces of the same pastry. Calaveras, or sugar skulls, display colorful designs to represent the vitality and individual personality of the departed.

In addition to food, drinks are also important to the tradition of Day of the Dead. Historically, the main alcoholic drink was pulque; today families will commonly drink the favorite beverage of their deceased ancestors. Other drinks associated with the holiday are atole and champurrado, warm, thick, non-alcoholic masa drinks.

Agua de Jamaica (water of hibiscus) is a popular herbal tea made of the flowers and leaves of the Jamaican hibiscus plant (Hibiscus sabdariffa), known as flor de Jamaica in Mexico. It is served cold and quite sweet with a lot of ice. The ruby-red beverage is also known as hibiscus tea in English-speaking countries.

In the Yucatán Peninsula, mukbil pollo (píib chicken) is traditionally prepared on October 31 or November 1, and eaten by the family throughout the following days. It is similar to a big tamal, composed of masa and pork lard, and stuffed with pork, chicken, tomato, garlic, peppers, onions, epazote, achiote, and spices. Once stuffed, the mukbil pollo is bathed in kool sauce, made with meat broth, habanero chili, and corn masa. It is then covered in banana leaves and steamed in an underground oven over the course of several hours. Once cooked, it is dug up and opened to eat.

=== Calaveras ===
A common symbol of the holiday is the skull (in Spanish calavera), which celebrants represent in masks, called calacas (colloquial term for skeleton), and foods such as chocolate or sugar skulls, which are inscribed with the name of the recipient on the forehead. Sugar skulls can be given as gifts to both the living and the dead. Other holiday foods include pan de muerto, a sweet egg bread made in various shapes from plain rounds to skulls, often decorated with white frosting to look like twisted bones.

=== Calaverita ===
In some parts of the country, especially the larger cities, children in costumes roam the streets, knocking on people's doors for a calaverita, a small gift of candies or money; they also ask passersby for it. This custom is similar to that of Halloween's trick-or-treating in the United States, but without the component of mischief to homeowners if no treat is given.

=== Calaveras literarias ===
A distinctive literary form exists within this holiday where people write short poems in traditional rhyming verse, called calaveras literarias (lit. 'literary skulls'), which are mocking, light-hearted epitaphs mostly dedicated to friends, classmates, co-workers, or family members (living or dead) but also to public or historical figures, describing interesting habits and attitudes, as well as comedic or absurd anecdotes that use death-related imagery which includes but is not limited to cemeteries, skulls, or the grim reaper, all of this in situations where the dedicatee has an encounter with death itself. This custom originated in the 18th or 19th century after a newspaper published a poem narrating a dream of a cemetery in the future which included the words "and all of us were dead", and then proceeding to read the tombstones. Current newspapers dedicate calaveras literarias to public figures, with cartoons of skeletons in the style of the famous calaveras of José Guadalupe Posada, a Mexican illustrator. In modern Mexico, calaveras literarias are a staple of the holiday in many institutions and organizations, for example, in public schools, students are encouraged or required to write them as part of the language class.

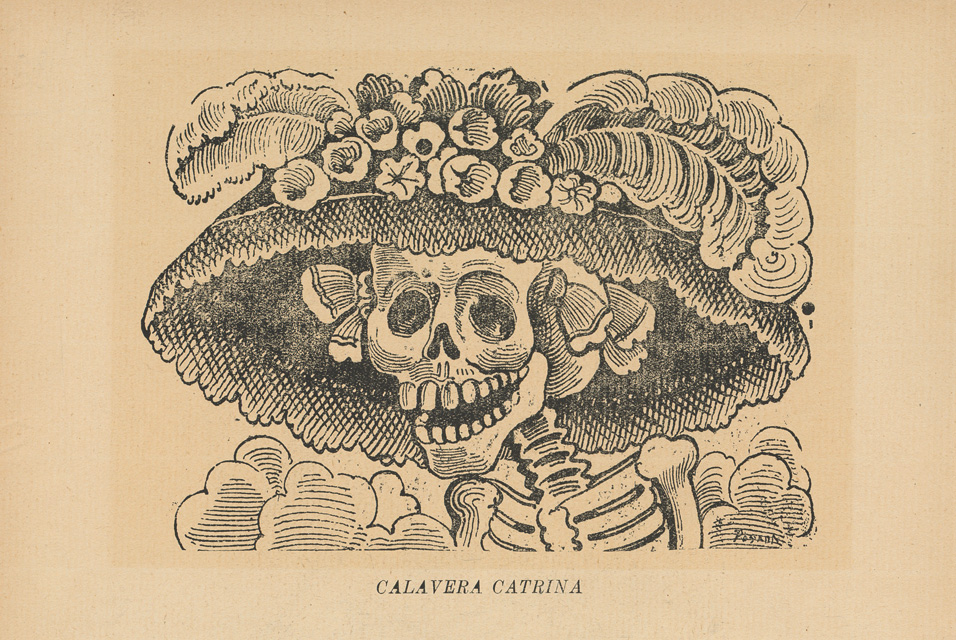
José Guadalupe Posada's depiction of La Calavera Catrina, shown wearing a then-fashionable early 20th-century hat.

Posada's most famous print, La Calavera Catrina ("The Elegant Skull"), was likely intended as a criticism of Mexican upper-class women who imitated European fashions. It was first published posthumously in a broadside with a text (not by Posada) that mocked working-class vendors of chickpeas.

Posada's image of a skeletal figure with a big hat decorated with two ostrich feathers and flowers was elaborated into a full scale figure by Mexican Muralist Diego Rivera in a fresco painted in 1946–47. Rivera's Catrina has a simple Tehuana dress and a feather boa, as well as other features that make allusions to the indigenous peoples of Mexico. Through the addition of these indigenous features, Rivera rehabilitated Catrina into a nationalist emblem.

The Catrina character has become deeply associated with the Day of the Dead. Catrina figures made of a wide range of materials, as well as people with Catrina costumes, have come to play a prominent role in modern Day of the Dead observances in Mexico and elsewhere. The Catrina phenomenon has in fact gone beyond Day of the Dead, resulting in non-seasonal and even permanent "Catrinas", including COVID-19 masks, tattoos, permanently decorated cars, and Catrina-themed artworks. Some artists have even developed a sub-specialization in Catrina imagery.

Theatrical presentations of Don Juan Tenorio by José Zorrilla (1817–1893) are also traditional on this day.

Building altars and decorating them with photos, candles, flowers and bringing food is one of the traditional aspects of the day of the dead. The motive of these sacrifices is to symbolically welcome the spirits of the dead in the afterlife and ease their passage back to earth during the festival.

=== Local traditions ===
The traditions and activities that take place in celebration of the Day of the Dead are not universal, often varying from town to town. For example, in the town of Pátzcuaro on the Lago de Pátzcuaro in Michoacán, the tradition is very different if the deceased is a child rather than an adult. On November 1 of the year after a child's death, the godparents set a table in the parents' home with sweets, fruits, pan de muerto, a cross, a rosary (used to ask the Virgin Mary to pray for them), and candles. This is meant to celebrate the child's life, in respect and appreciation for the parents. There is also dancing with colorful costumes, often with skull-shaped masks and devil masks in the plaza or garden of the town. At midnight on November 2, the people light candles and ride winged boats called mariposas (butterflies) to Janitzio, an island in the middle of the lake where there is a cemetery, to honor and celebrate the lives of the dead there.

In contrast, the town of Ocotepec, north of Cuernavaca in the State of Morelos, opens its doors to visitors in exchange for veladoras (small wax candles) to show respect for the recently deceased. In return, the visitors receive tamales and atole. This is done only by the owners of the house where someone in the household has died in the previous year. Many people of the surrounding areas arrive early to eat for free and enjoy the elaborate altars set up to receive the visitors.

Another unique tradition involving children is La Danza de los Viejitos (the Dance of the Old Men), where boys and young men dressed like grandfathers crouch and jump in an energetic dance.

=== Parade in Mexico City ===
Exhibit of the 2017 parade

In the 2015 James Bond film Spectre, the opening sequence features a Day of the Dead parade in Mexico City. At the time, no such parade took place in Mexico City; one year later, due to the interest in the film and the government desire to promote the Mexican culture, the federal and local authorities decided to organize an actual Day of the Dead Parade through Paseo de la Reforma and Centro Historico on October 29, 2016, which was attended by 250,000 people. This could be seen as an example of the pizza effect. The idea of a massive celebration was also popularized in the Disney Pixar movie Coco.

== Observances outside of Mexico ==
=== North America ===
==== United States ====
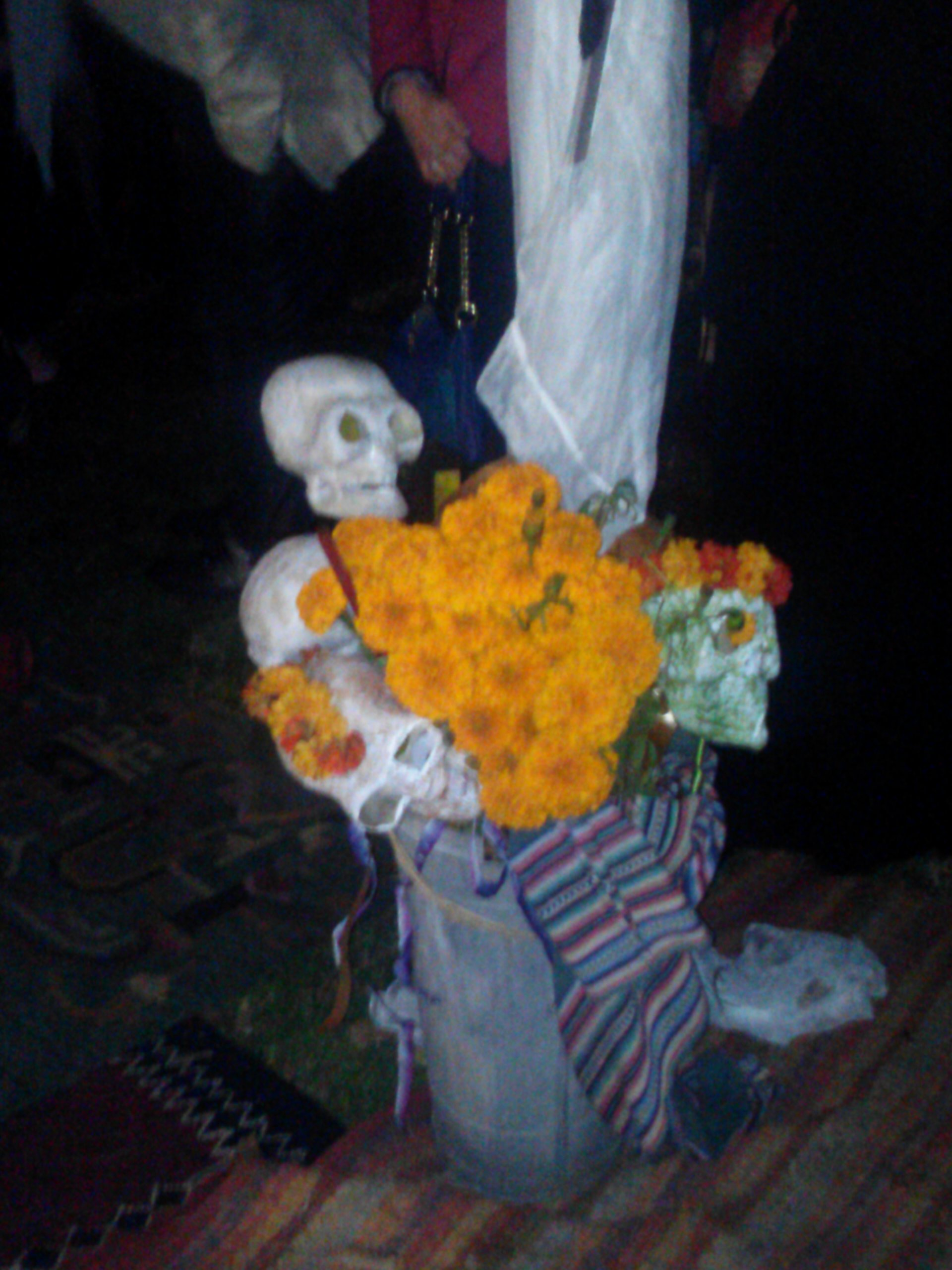
An ánima (lit. 'soul') for the dead.

In many communities in the United States with residents of Mexican ancestry, Día de los Muertos celebrations are very similar to those held in Mexico. In some of these communities, in states such as Texas, New Mexico, and Arizona, the celebrations tend to be mostly traditional. The All Souls' Procession has been an annual event since 1990 in Tucson, Arizona. The event combines elements of traditional Día de los Muertos celebrations with those of pagan harvest festivals. People wearing masks carry signs honoring the dead and an urn in which people can place slips of paper with prayers on them to be burned.

The festival also was held annually at historic Forest Hills Cemetery in Boston's Jamaica Plain neighborhood. Sponsored by Forest Hills Educational Trust and the folkloric performance group La Piñata, the Day of the Dead festivities celebrated the cycle of life and death. People brought offerings of flowers, photos, mementos, and food for their departed loved ones, which they placed at an elaborately and colorfully decorated altar. A program of traditional music and dance also accompanied the community event. The Jamaica Plain celebration was discontinued in 2011.

The Smithsonian Institution, in collaboration with the University of Texas at El Paso and Second Life, have created a Smithsonian Latino Virtual Museum and accompanying multimedia e-book: Día de los Muertos: Day of the Dead. The project's website contains some of the text and images which explain the origins of some of the customary core practices related to the Day of the Dead, such as the background beliefs and the offrenda (the special altar commemorating one's deceased loved one). The Made For iTunes multimedia e-book version provides additional content, such as further details; additional photo galleries; pop-up profiles of influential Latino artists and cultural figures over the decades; and video clips of interviews with artists who make Día de Muertos-themed artwork, explanations and performances of Aztec and other traditional dances, an animation short that explains the customs to children, virtual poetry readings in English and Spanish.

In 2021, the Biden-Harris administration celebrated the Día de los Muertos.

===== California =====
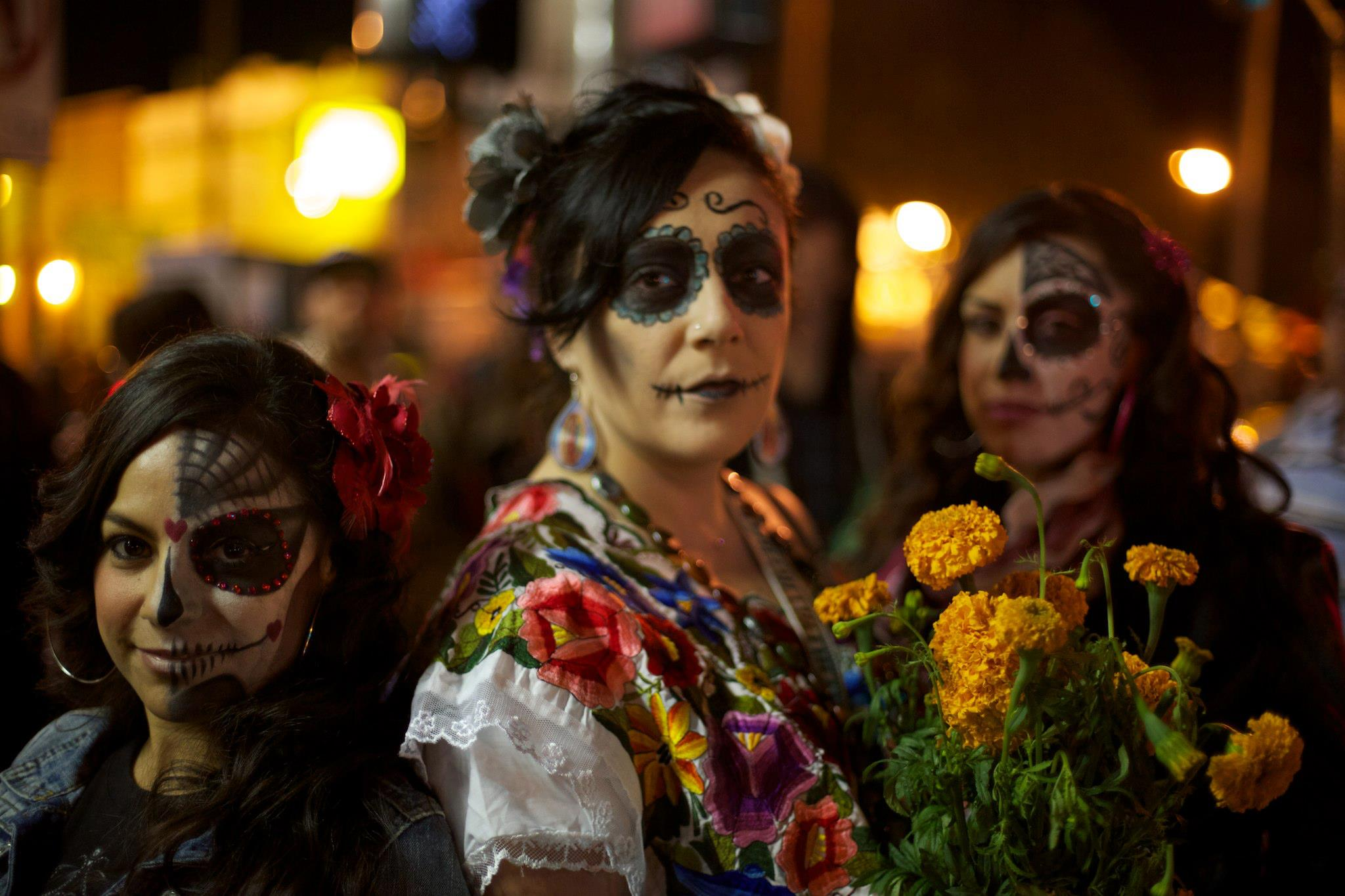
Women with calaveras makeup celebrating Día de Muertos in the Mission District of San Francisco, California.

The celebration of the Day of the Dead in Santa Ana, California has grown to two large events with the creation of an event held at the Santa Ana Regional Transportation Center for the first time on November 1, 2015. The city also holds the largest annual Noche de Altares in southern California, which began in 2002.

In other communities, interactions between Mexican traditions and American culture are resulting in celebrations in which Mexican traditions are being extended to make artistic or sometimes political statements. For example, in Los Angeles, California, the Self Help Graphics & Art Mexican-American cultural center presents an annual Day of the Dead celebration that includes both traditional and political elements, such as altars to honor the victims of the Iraq War, highlighting the high casualty rate among Latino soldiers. An updated, intercultural version of the Day of the Dead is also evolving at Hollywood Forever Cemetery. There, in a mixture of Native Californian art, Mexican traditions and Hollywood hip, conventional altars are set up side by side with altars to Jayne Mansfield and Johnny Ramone. Colorful native dancers and music intermix with performance artists, while others play on traditional themes.

Similar traditional and intercultural updating of Mexican celebrations take place in the San Francisco Bay Area. In San Francisco they are held at the Galería de la Raza, SomArts Cultural Center, Mission Cultural Center, and the de Young Museum, along with altars placed at Garfield Square by the Marigold Project. Across the Bay, Oakland is home to Corazon Del Pueblo in the Fruitvale district. There is a museum devoted to Día de los Muertos artifacts and a shop offering handcrafted Mexican gifts. Corazon Del Pueblo serves as the hub of the annual Día de los Muertos festival, which takes place the last weekend of October. There a mix of several Mexican traditions come together with traditional Aztec dancers, regional Mexican music, and other Mexican artisans to celebrate the day.

In San Diego County, which borders Mexico, celebrations range across the entire county. Oceanside, in the far northern part of the county, observes their annual event with community and family altars built around the Oceanside Civic Center and Pier View Way, as well as events at the Mission San Luis Rey de Francia. In the central part of San Diego, the City Heights neighborhood celebrates through a public festival in Jeremy Henwood Memorial Park that includes at least 35 altars, lowriders, and entertainment, all free of charge. Old Town San Diego annually hosts a traditional two-day celebration culminating in a candlelight procession to the historic El Campo Santo Cemetery. Further south, in Chula Vista, they celebrate the tradition through a movie night at Third and Davidson streets. This includes a community altar, an altar contest, and a catrin/catrina contest.

=== Europe ===
==== Czech Republic ====
As part of a promotion by the Mexican embassy in Prague, since the late 20th century, some local citizens join in a Mexican-style Day of the Dead. A theater group conducts events involving candles, masks, and make-up using luminous paint in the form of sugar skulls.

==== Italy ====
In Italy, November 2 is All Souls' Day and is colloquially known as Day of the Dead or Giorno dei Morti. While many regional nuances exist, celebrations generally consist of placing flowers at cemeteries and family burial sites and speaking to deceased relatives.

In Sicily, families celebrate a long-held Day of the Dead tradition called The Festival of the Dead or Festa dei Morti. On the eve of November 1, La Festa di Ognissanti, or All Saints' Day, older family members act as the defunti, or spirits of deceased family members, who sneak into the home and hide sweets and gifts for their young descendants to awake to. On the morning of November 2, children begin the day by hunting to find the gifts in shoes or a special wicker basket of the dead called cannistru dei morti or u cannistru, which typically consist of various sweets, small toys, boned-shaped almond flavored cookies called ossa dei morti, sugar dolls called pupi di Zucchero, and fruit, vegetable, and ghoul-shaped marzipan treats called Frutta martorana. After gifts are shared and breakfast is enjoyed, the whole family will often visit the cemetery or burial site bearing flowers. They will light candles and play amongst the graves to thank the deceased for the gifts, before enjoying a hearty feast. The tradition holds that the spirits of the deceased will remain with the family to enjoy a day of feasting and merriment. In Sicily, families enjoy special day of the dead cakes and cookies that are made into symbolic shapes such as skulls and finger bones. The "sweets of the dead" are a marzipan treats called frutta martorana.

In addition to visiting their own family members, some people pay respects to those without a family. Some Italians take it upon themselves to adopt centuries-old unclaimed bodies and give them offerings like money or jewelry as a way to ease their pain and ask for favors.

=== Asia and Oceania ===
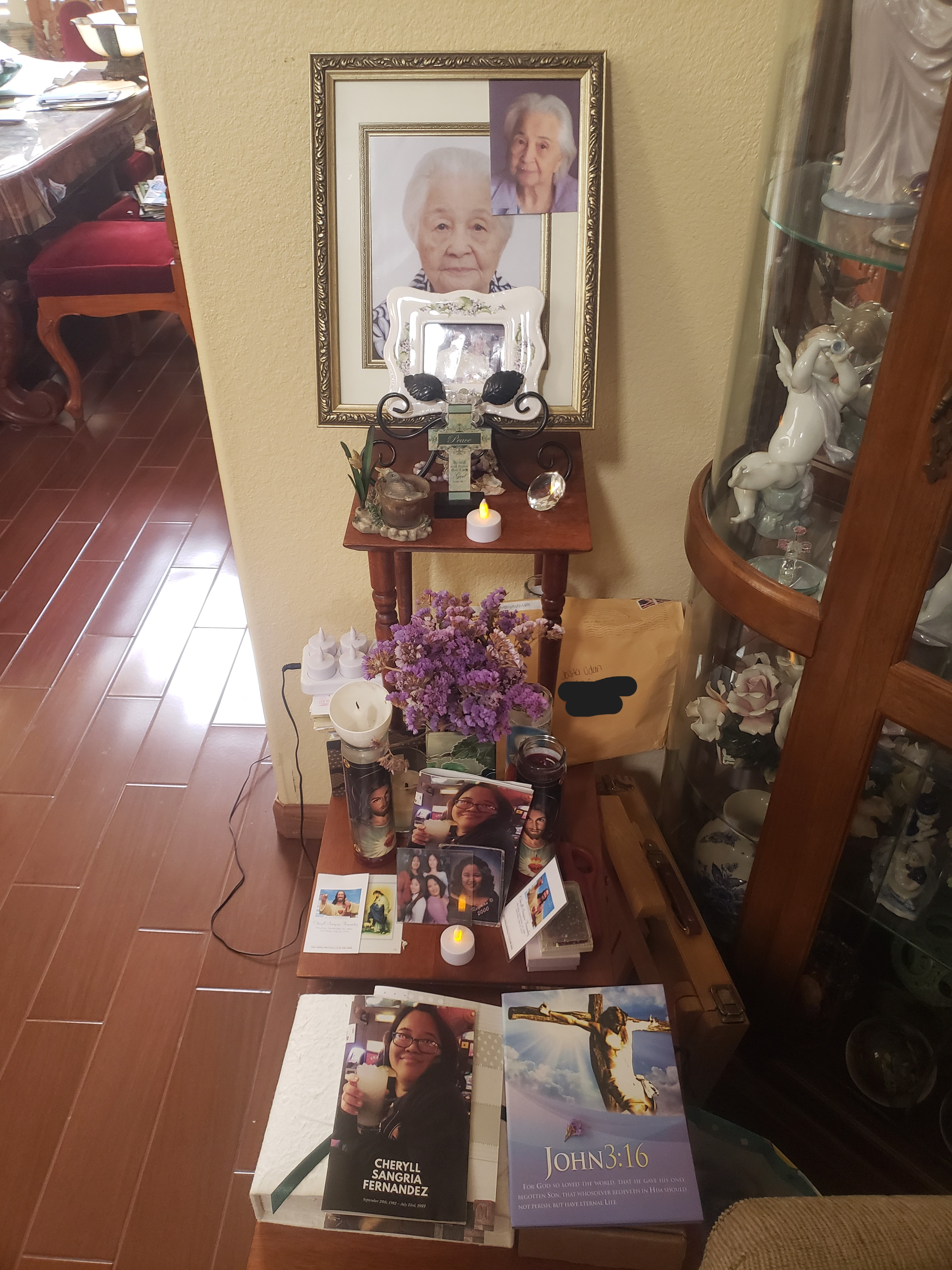
A ofrenda in a Filipino American household.

Mexican-style Day of the Dead celebrations occur in major cities in Australia, Fiji, and Indonesia, most organized by Mexican communities. Additionally, an independent annual celebration is held in Wellington, New Zealand, complete with altars celebrating the deceased with flowers and gifts.

==== Philippines ====
In the Philippines Undás and Araw ng mga Yumao, All Saints' Day and All Souls' Day, are celebrated following with the Catholic tradition. Filipinos traditionally observe these days by visiting the family dead to clean and repair their tombs, just as is done in Mexico. Offerings of prayers, flowers, candles, and food, while Chinese Filipinos additionally burn joss sticks and joss paper (kim). Many also spend the day and ensuing night holding reunions at the cemetery, having feasts and merriment. Due to the cultural connections of the Philippines and Mexico with links going back to the Spanish Empire, being linked through the Manila Galleons and common administration as part of New Spain, they share some of the aspects of the practices done in the celebration.

== Similar or related festivities ==
=== Latin America ===
==== Belize ====
In Belize, Day of the Dead is practiced by people of the Yucatec Maya ethnicity. The celebration is known as Hanal Pixan which means 'food for the souls' in their language. Altars are constructed and decorated with food, drinks, candies, and candles put on them.

==== Bolivia ====
Día de las Ñatitas ("Day of the Skulls") is a festival celebrated in La Paz, Bolivia, at the beginning of November after the celebrations of All Saints. In pre-Columbian times indigenous Andeans had a tradition of sharing a day with the bones of their ancestors on the third year after burial. Today families keep only the skulls for such rituals, known as ñatitas. Traditionally, the skulls of family members are kept at home to watch over the family and protect them during the year. On November 9, the family crowns the skulls with fresh flowers, sometimes also dressing them in various garments, and making offerings of cigarettes, coca leaves, alcohol, and various other items in thanks for the year's protection. The skulls are also sometimes taken to the central cemetery in La Paz for a special Mass and blessing.

==== Brazil ====
The Brazilian public holiday of Dia de Finados, Dia dos Mortos or Dia dos Fiéis Defuntos (Portuguese: "Day of the Dead" or "Day of the Faithful Deceased") is celebrated on November 2. Similar to other Day of the Dead celebrations, people go to cemeteries and churches with flowers and candles and offer prayers. The celebration is intended as a positive honoring of the dead. Memorializing the dead draws from indigenous and European Catholic origins.

==== Costa Rica ====
Costa Rica celebrates Día De Los Muertos on November 2. The day is also called Día de Todos Santos (All Saints Day) and Día de Todos Almas (All Souls' Day). Catholic masses are celebrated and people visit their loved ones' graves to decorate them with flowers and candles.

==== Ecuador ====
In Ecuador the Day of the Dead is observed to some extent by all parts of society, though it is especially important to the indigenous Kichwa peoples, who make up an estimated quarter of the population. Indigena families gather together in the community cemetery with offerings of food for a day-long remembrance of their ancestors and lost loved ones. Ceremonial foods include colada morada, a spiced fruit porridge that derives its deep purple color from the Andean blackberry and purple maize. This is typically consumed with guaguas de pan, bread shaped like infants (or, more generally, people), though variations include many pigs—the latter being traditional to the city of Loja. The bread, which is wheat flour-based today, but was made with masa in the Pre-Columbian era, can be made savory with cheese inside or sweet with a filling of guava paste. These traditions have permeated mainstream society, as well, where food establishments add both colada morada and guaguas de pan to their menus for the season. Many non-indigenous Ecuadorians visit the graves of the deceased, cleaning and bringing flowers, or preparing the traditional foods, too.

==== Guatemala ====
Guatemalan celebrations of the Day of the Dead, on November 1, are highlighted by the construction and flying of giant kites. It is customary to fly kites to help the spirits find their way back to Earth. A few kites have notes for the dead attached to the strings of the kites. The kites are used as a kind of telecommunication to heaven. A big event also is the consumption of fiambre, which is made only for this day during the year. In addition to the traditional visits to grave sites of ancestors, the tombs and graves are decorated with flowers, candles, and food for the dead. In a few towns, Guatemalans repair and repaint the cemetery with vibrant colors to bring the cemetery to life. They fix things that have gotten damaged over the years or just simply need a touch-up, such as wooden grave cross markers. They also lay flower wreaths on the graves. Some families have picnics in the cemetery.

==== Honduras ====
In Honduras, November 2 is widely commemorated as the Day of the Dead, a date on which a special mass is celebrated and families visit cemeteries, decorate graves, and bring flowers, candles, or other objects for their deceased loved ones Some Honduran traditions state that relatives clean and adorn graves, clean cemeteries, and bring wreaths or arrangements. This celebration in the Honduran context is more focused in cemeteries than homes. In some regions of the country during November 1, white flowers are placed especially for deceased children, as a sign of the purity of their souls. In some cases, music or entertainment is brought to the cemetery as part of the collective or communal visit. Similar to other contexts, these customs have a strong Christian-Catholic component combined with popular elements that may have local pre-Columbian roots.

==== Peru ====
It is common for Peruvians to visit the cemetery, play music and bring flowers to decorate the graves of dead relatives.

=== Europe ===
==== Southern Italy and Sicily ====
A traditional biscotti-type cookie, ossa di morto or bones of the dead are made and placed in shoes once worn by dead relatives.

== In popular culture ==
- In 2010, Sepulcro Bohemio, an album featuring several songs inspired by Day of the Dead stories, was released. It includes contributions from singer-songwriters such as Erandini Aparicio, Iván Antillón and José Riaza.

== See also ==
- Bon Festival
- Danse Macabre – Artistic motif on the universality of death
- Dziady – Slavic folk holiday
- Literary Calavera – Mexican literary form
- Pitru Paksha – 16–lunar day period in Hindu calendar for ancestral worship
- Qingming Festival – Chinese festival honouring ancestors
- Shab-e-Barat – Islamic holiday
- Skull art – Use of skulls and skeletons in art
- Thursday of the Dead – Feast day in the Levant
- Veneration of the dead – Cultural or religious practice
