= Literary Calavera =

Mexican literary form

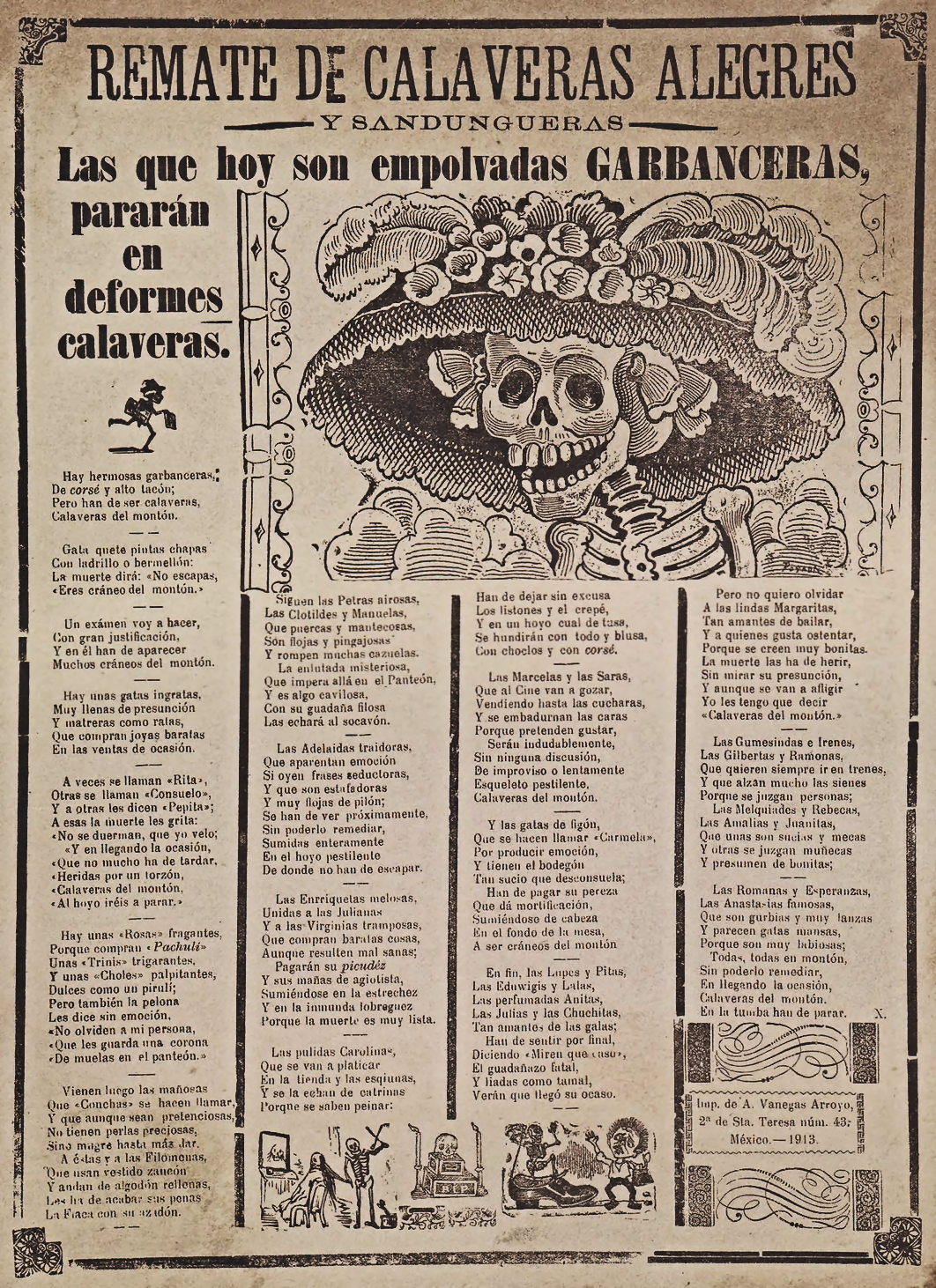
Posada's La Calavera Garbancera together with a literary calaverita in 1913

The Literary Calavera or calavera literaria (Spanish: literary skull) is a traditional Mexican literary form: a satirical or light-hearted writing in verse, often composed for the Day of the Dead. In some parts of Mexico, it is a common tradition for children and adults to write "Calaveritas" (Spanish: little skull) for friends, colleagues, or relatives, in which the addressee is typically portrayed as dead.

== History ==
Initially known as panteones, these verses had their origin in the 19th century as mocking epitaph and a way of expressing ideas or feelings that in other occasions might be difficult to express. For this reason they were often censored or destroyed, since they also often served as a means to express political satire. The first calaveras were published in 1879, in the newspaper El Socialista, of Guadalajara.

== Features ==
- They are irreverent verses, written as epitaphs, portraying people as if they were dead.
- They are used to channel feelings that in another context would be difficult to express.
- They are usually accompanied by drawings of skulls.
- They are traditional Mexican compositions.
