= All Soul's Weekend =

Annual event in Tucson, Arizona

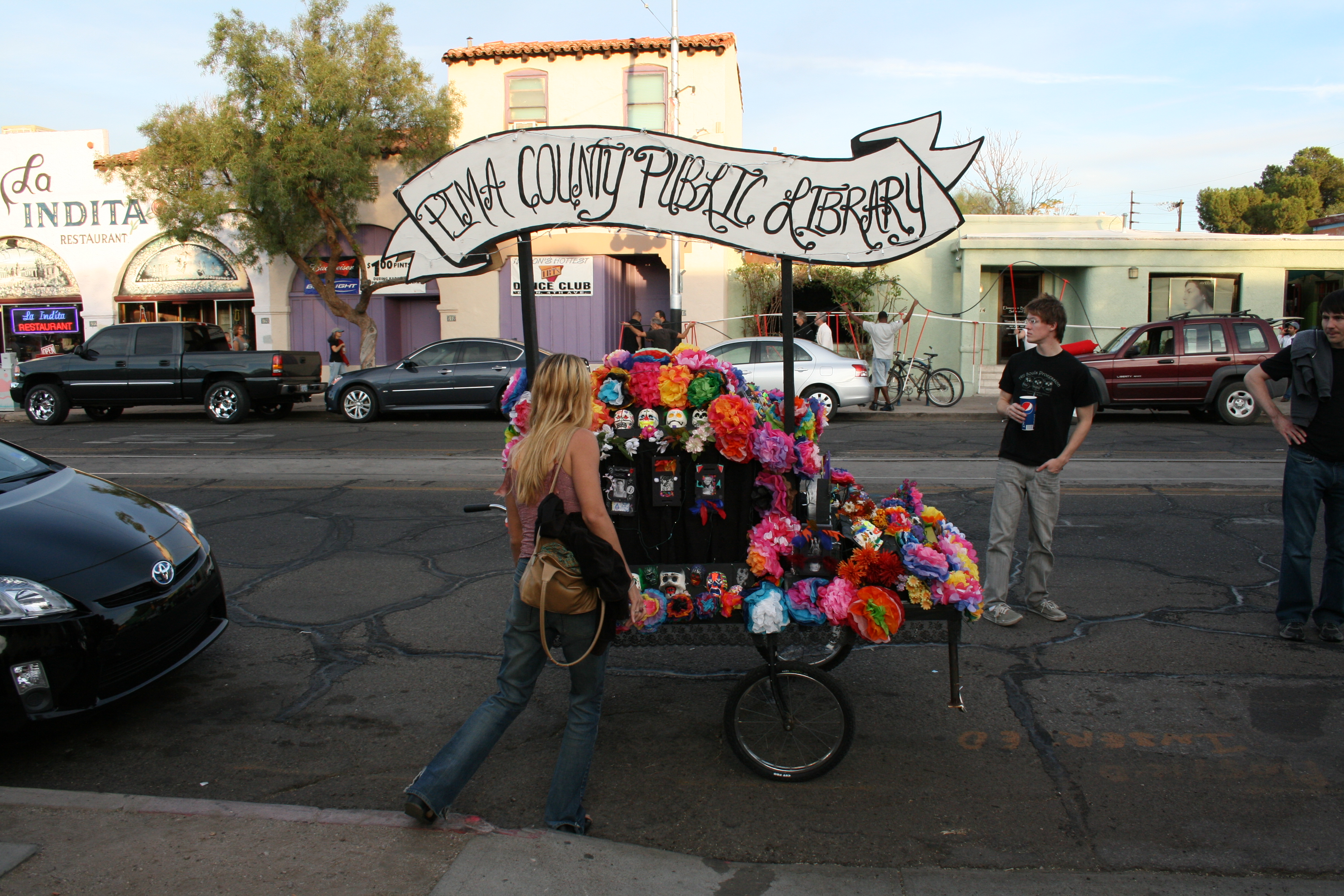
Pima County Public Library Day of the Dead float for 2009 procession

The All Souls Procession Weekend is an event in Tucson, Arizona. It draws on Mesoamerican, Spanish Roman Catholic, and Mexican rituals, incorporating many diverse cultural traditions with the common goal of honoring and remembering the deceased.

== Background ==
The All Souls Procession Weekend is more commonly known as the All Souls Procession and is derived from the All Souls Procession, an event first initiated and organized in 1990 by Tucson artist Susan Kay Johnson to "express her sorrow" over the recent death of her father and to initiate an artistic ritual in honor of the dead in Tucson. Johnson had studied art therapy based in part on the work of Swiss psychoanalyst Carl Jung including his study of rituals in cultures around the world. After her father died, Johnson planned and invited other artists to participate in a three-day ritual, which lasted from Halloween through All Saints Day and ended on All Souls Day. The ritual took place in public and private spaces in downtown Tucson, and involved art objects Johnson created for the event.

By 1991, public interest the ritual led artist Sue Johnson to apply for a grant from the Tucson Partnership in order to involve the Tucson community in the event, through free public workshops in art and music followed by a large procession. One of the artists listed on the grant application, Mykl Wells, has reported that he helped Johnson write the 1991 grant application, on which his name is spelled "Michael Wells." Wells has reported that he helped inspire Johnson's initial planning of the 1990 All Souls Procession when he told Johnson about Día de los Muertos rituals he had witnessed in Guanajuato, Mexico in the 1980s.

In 1998, Susan Johnson transferred direction of the procession over to Nadia Hagen-Onuktav, founder of the performance troupe Flam Chen. Flam Chen added new circus elements and musicians to create a "Resolving Ceremony" to the event.

In 2006, Many Mouths One Stomach, (MMOS) was given non-profit status and became the official producer of the event.

As of 2024, The Weekend has grown into multiple installations, workshops and events.

Free Workshops in performance, craft and traditional arts forms are facilitated by local artists from Sept- Nov.

(Mid Oct.- Nov.) Community Altar and Dedication- Jose Duran/ Danza Coaltique- An open-air, physical collection space for Prayers and Mementos to be burned in the Urn during the Finale Ceremony. The space is created and consecrated by Jose Duran and the elders of the local neighborhood. It includes a shrine and the Ancestor's Project, where photo submissions from all over the world are projected in a rolling slideshow that frames the shrine.

2019-2021 -The Journey thru Grief is a collection of interactive art installations along the Santa Cruz Riverwalk, built to give the public experiential metaphors for emotional states of grieving. Participants could place large boulders in the “Memory Spiral.” Tie pieces of fabric that belonged to their loved ones on the Ribbon Tree, or talk to their lost loved ones on a “Spirit Phone”.

The Procession of Little Angels is a free family- friendly pint-sized Procession that takes place in a public park on the day before the Procession.

The Main Procession travels through some of the oldest Barrios in Tucson and culminates in the Mercado District.

The Dance of the Dead is a series of Benefit Concerts and events that support the free event.

The Domo is an open invitation for the procession to walk across the Mainstage.

Each year's Restoration of Care Ceremony is inspired by a color or theme. Each year hosts a Musical Guest, previous collabs have been with, Tribe Called Red, Soriah, Filastine, Fine Stream Gamelan, Steve Roach, Odaiko Sonora and The Tucson Symphony Orchestra.

ControversyOrganizers of All Souls Weekend have made explicit efforts to present the All Souls Procession and associated events as inclusive of but distinct in origin from Día de los Muertos, partly in response to charges of cultural appropriation by academic critics who have charged that its organizers and participants have primarily been Anglo-Americans. Similar charges have been directed at the Day of the Dead parade in the Mission District in San Francisco. However, with All Souls Weekend events now bringing together over 100,000 people of varying backgrounds in a public celebration in downtown Tucson, the organizers influence but do not control the traditions participants choose to represent and honor in the event. Each year thousands of participants in All Souls Weekend activities choose to wear calavera-style makeup and objects, familiar to many in Tucson due to the city's location 50 miles from the US-Mexico border. After the Spanish conquest of middle America, ancient Mesoamerican rituals merged with Roman Catholic tradition along with modern cultural interests in the Americas, yielding the holiday known today as Día de los Muertos in Spanish or Day of the Dead in English. At least one writer has argued that All Soul's Weekend in Tucson represents a further step in the evolution of precolonial Mesoamerican rituals and Day of the Dead. Though there is evidence the All Souls Procession was directly inspired by the history of Day of the Dead, the organizers of the All Soul's Weekend emphasize that the event includes and encourages all forms of individual expression, drawing from many cultures, religions, and rituals. The mission of the weekend's primary organizing body, Many Mouths One Stomach (MMOS), includes the perspective that death is a universal experience, uniting deceased loved ones with the living. MMOS intends All Soul's Weekend to serve as an opportunity to approach death in a safe social setting.

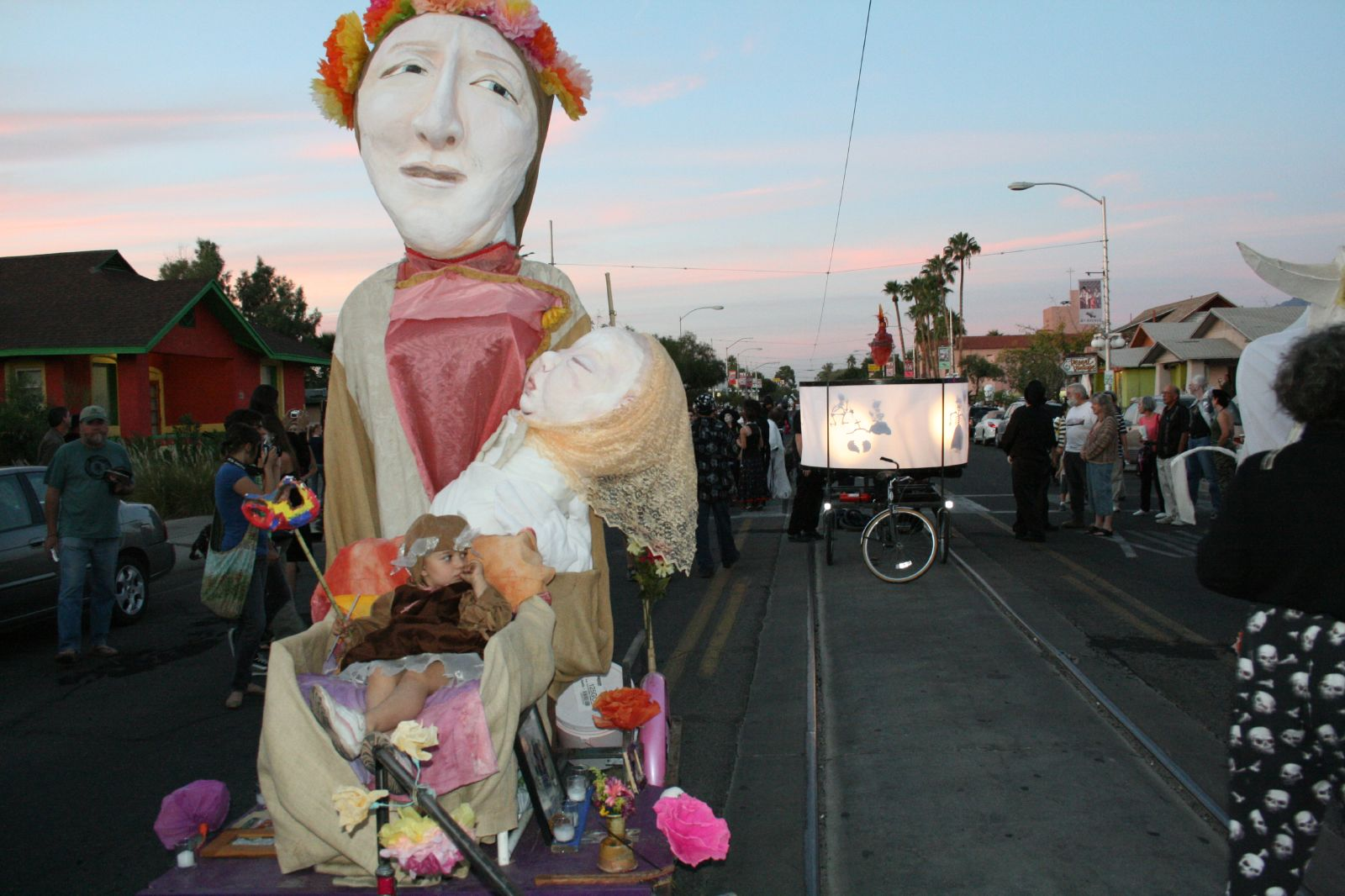
A puppet, by artist Sarah Cotten representing her grandmother and mother, in the All Souls Procession.

== All Soul's Procession ==
All Soul's Weekend culminates with its largest event, a parade called the All Soul's Procession. According to MMOS, “The All Souls Procession is perhaps one of the most important, inclusive and authentic public ceremonies in North America today.” Participants often dress up, wear masks, paint their faces, create intricate artistic installations, and tow altars, also engaging in numerous other forms of expression in remembrance of the deceased. The deceased may include family, friends, pets, endangered species, fallen heroes, victims of war, or any other group that an individual feels deserving of remembrance. The procession is a forum for the community to engage in open authentic expression of grief, loss, joy, and celebration. The procession is led by a large steel sculpture called The Urn in which procession attendees are invited to place prayers, photographs, and other remembrances of lost loved ones. At the end of the procession, The Urn is set on fire. Burning of The Urn serves the purpose of uniting individual remembrances into one cathartic communal expression of both grief and celebration honoring lost loved ones.

== Attendance and Sponsorship ==
Attendance to, and participation in, All Soul's Weekend is free to the public. The event itself includes no sponsor advertising. MMOS is a non-profit organization funded exclusively by donations and Art Grants. All Soul's Weekend costs approximately one dollar per attendee. The total cost for the 2014 procession was $109,850. MMOS expresses pride in the community based nature of All Soul's Weekend and does not intend to seek corporate sponsorship as, “that funding is likely to come with requirements and obligations we are reluctant to take on”. Of all participants in the Procession, an average of 3,000 donate while 97,000 do not. Tax deductible donations from individuals and groups, including businesses and private organizations, may be made to MMOS in support of All Soul's Weekend.
