= Ñatita =

Human skull venerated by Aymara people

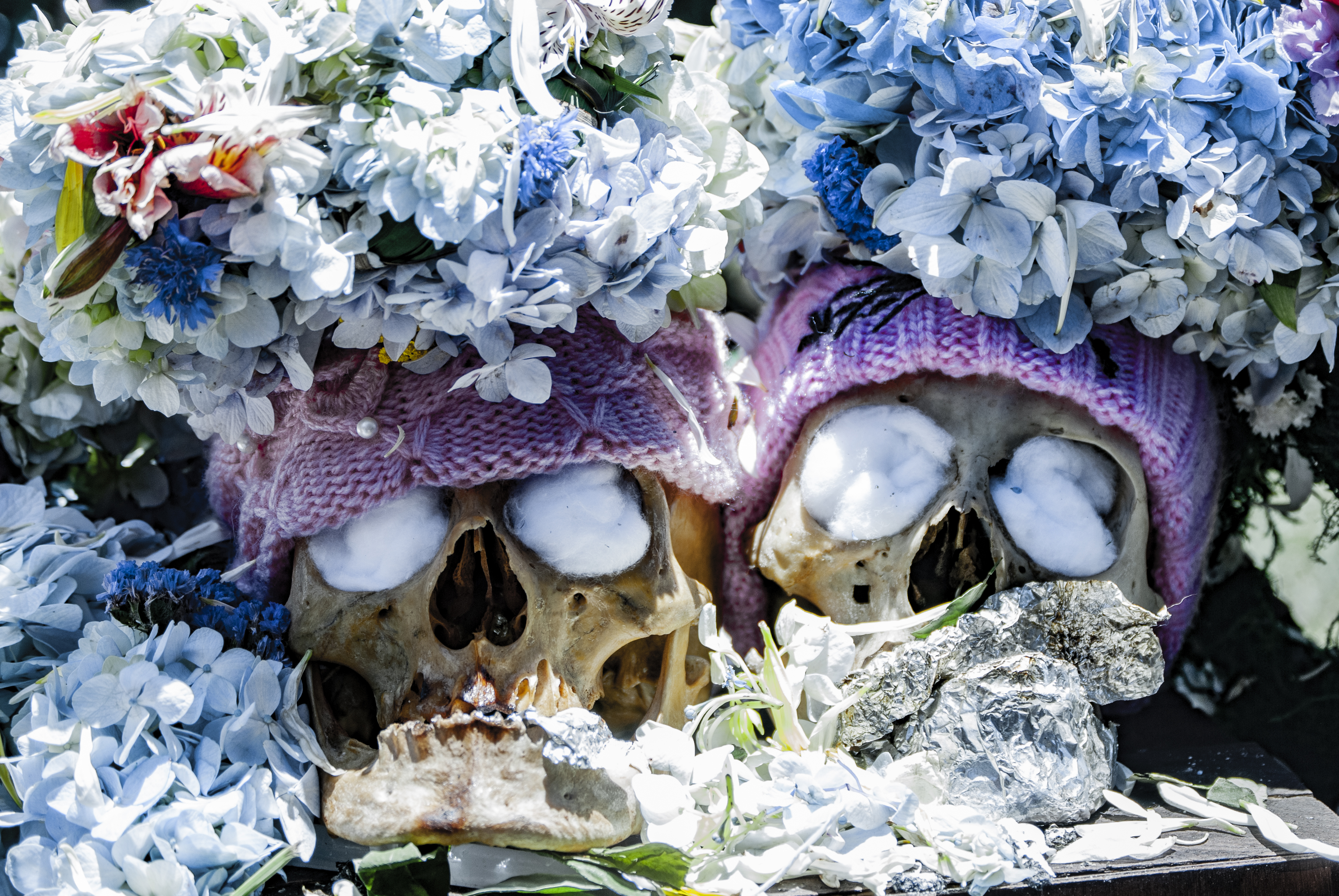
Two ñatitas

A ñatita (Andean Spanish for "little pug-nosed one") is a human skull that is venerated by Aymara people in Bolivia. Ñatitas are believed to be vessels for spirits and they are often kept in shrines in homes to bring good fortune to their owners as well as to offer protection from evil spirits. Día de las Ñatitas, a festival celebrating ñatitas, is held annually on 8 November in La Paz as well as by indigenous communities in the Andes.

== History ==
Ñatitas are believed to derive from pre-Columbian times, where dead bodies were venerated by people and carried on litters to be reunited with their ajayus (an Aymara term for "soul" or "spirit"). The specific worship of skulls is understood to have emerged during the Tiwanaku polity, where people began to keep the heads of their ancestors, with the belief that doing so would bring them good fortune such as bringing rain during the dry season and warding off storms.

Following the arrival of the Spanish in Bolivia in the 16th century, indigenous traditions were outlawed, with people found to own ñatitas often tried for witchcraft and necromancy. The practice of possessing ñatitas continued, but largely in secret, and traditional Aymara beliefs around death became interlinked with Christian beliefs and practices after the conversion of much of Bolivia's native population to Christianity.

The use or knowledge of ñatitas remained limited to primary Aymara communities in rural areas until the 1970s, when many indigenous farmers moved to La Paz, the capital of Bolivia, which led to ñatitas becoming more commonly understood, seen and tolerated; more people also began to either keep or venerate ñatitas.

== Contemporary usage ==
Ñatitas cannot be easily obtained, and it is generally frowned upon to purchase one with money due to it putting financial value on spiritual matters. In present-day Bolivia, ñatitas generally are obtained from forgotten graves in cemeteries, though some families possess ñatitas of their ancestors that have been passed down the generations as family heirlooms. Some people consider ñatitas that come from people who experienced violent deaths to be stronger and more potent than those that do not.

Ñatitas are primarily kept in urns within shrines in private family homes; they are understood to hold the ajayus of the body they had belonged to. People who inherit or gain a ñatita are encouraged to visit a yateri in order to receive advice and support on how best to treat the specific ajayus in the ñatitas. They are understood to protect families from evil spirits and thieves, in addition to serving as good luck charms that can help their owners find love and attain physical and economic prosperity as well as fertility and luck. It has been reported that some police departments in La Paz have ñatitas due to a belief that they help them solve cases.

The theft of ñatitas is frowned upon, with it believed that the ajayus in the ñatitas will torment thieves and appear in the dreams of their rightful owners to inform them of their location so they can be rescued.

== Día de las Ñatitas ==
Día de las Ñatitas (lit. 'Day of the Ñatitas'), also known as the Fiesta de las Ñatitas, is celebrated annually eight days after All Saints' Day, generally on 8 November, although there have been incidents when the Catholic Church has not permitted Día de las Ñatitas to be celebrated on that date if it falls on a Sunday. It is a day-long festival where people celebrate and thank their ñatitas for looking after them. People often travel with their ñatitas to cemeteries, primarily the General Cemetery of La Paz, which attracts around 12, 000 visitors; people who do not own ñatitas will visit in order to make offerings to other people's ñatitas. Offerings can vary from music and sweets, cocoa leaves and flower petals, and alcohol and cigarettes. At some gatherings, Catholic masses are also held celebrating ñatitas, though this is controversial. The day often ends with various prestes being held alongside ñatitas, which are often dressed up with sunglasses and hats.

== Catholic response ==
In 2008, the Archdiocese of La Paz issued a statement describing the veneration of ñatitas as "un-Christian", prohibiting masses in churches that celebrated them; the Metropolitan Archbishop called on skulls to be "buried [and not] venerated". Many indigenous Bolivians continue to practice Catholicism alongside venerating ñatitas, and some priests continue to bless ñatitas and hold masses on Día de las Ñatitas despite calls from the Archdiocese, with this being described as an example of syncretism between Catholic and indigenous beliefs in Bolivia.
