= Danza de los Viejitos =

Traditional folk dance in Michoacán, Mexico

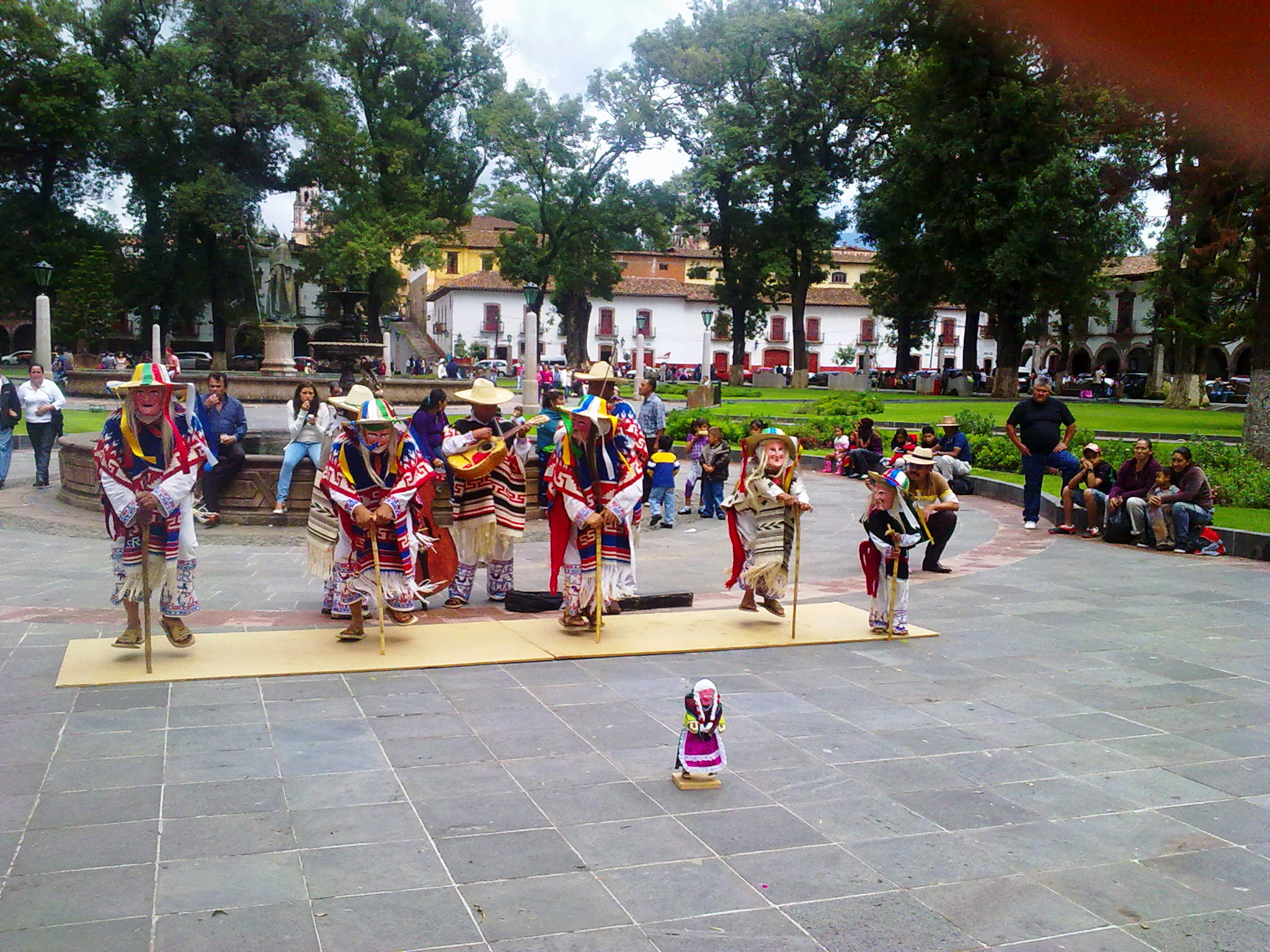
Danzantes in Pátzcuaro, Michoacán

The Danza de los viejitos (Spanish: Dance of the little old men) is a traditional folk dance in Michoacán, Mexico.

== Origin ==
The Danza de los Viejitos is a Mexican folk dance created by the Purépecha culture who lived incolonization, it was called T'arche Uarakua. The men that perform this dance are known as Danzantes or "Dancers." This dance was performed by four Petamunis (the town's wisest men). Four to represent fire, water, earth, and air. Four dancers are also believed to be the correct number to dance in this traditional performance because there are four colors that make corn which is red, yellow, white, and blue. The dance ask Tata Jurhiata (The Sun God) for good harvest, communication with spirits, and to learn about the past or to predict the future.

== Clothing ==
A Danzante wears a top and bottom made out of a white blanket. It is topped with a "sarape," which is a blanket worn as a cloak in Latin America. Each sarape contains different designs and colors. They wear a hat made out of straw with adorned lengthy pieces of ribbon, each one a different color. The ribbon is parted down the middle of the hat, each one hanging 10 cm on the sides. Their shoes are sandals that have a wooden sole in order to make a tapping noise throughout their dance, followed by a wooden cane they also use. The dancers also wear a mask made out of either wood, cornstalk paste, or clay with an elderly man's face painted on it.

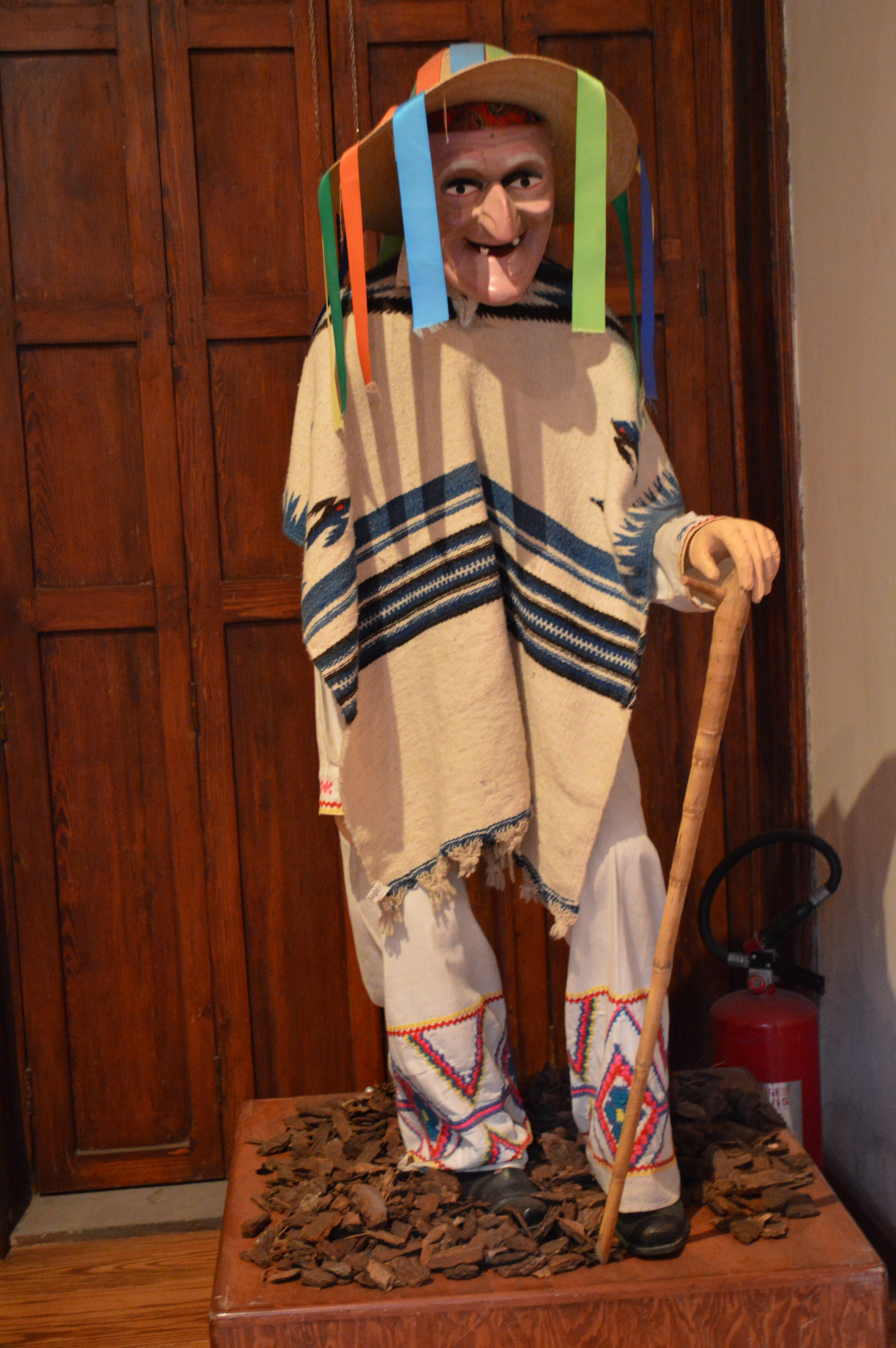
Traditional clothing from head to toe.

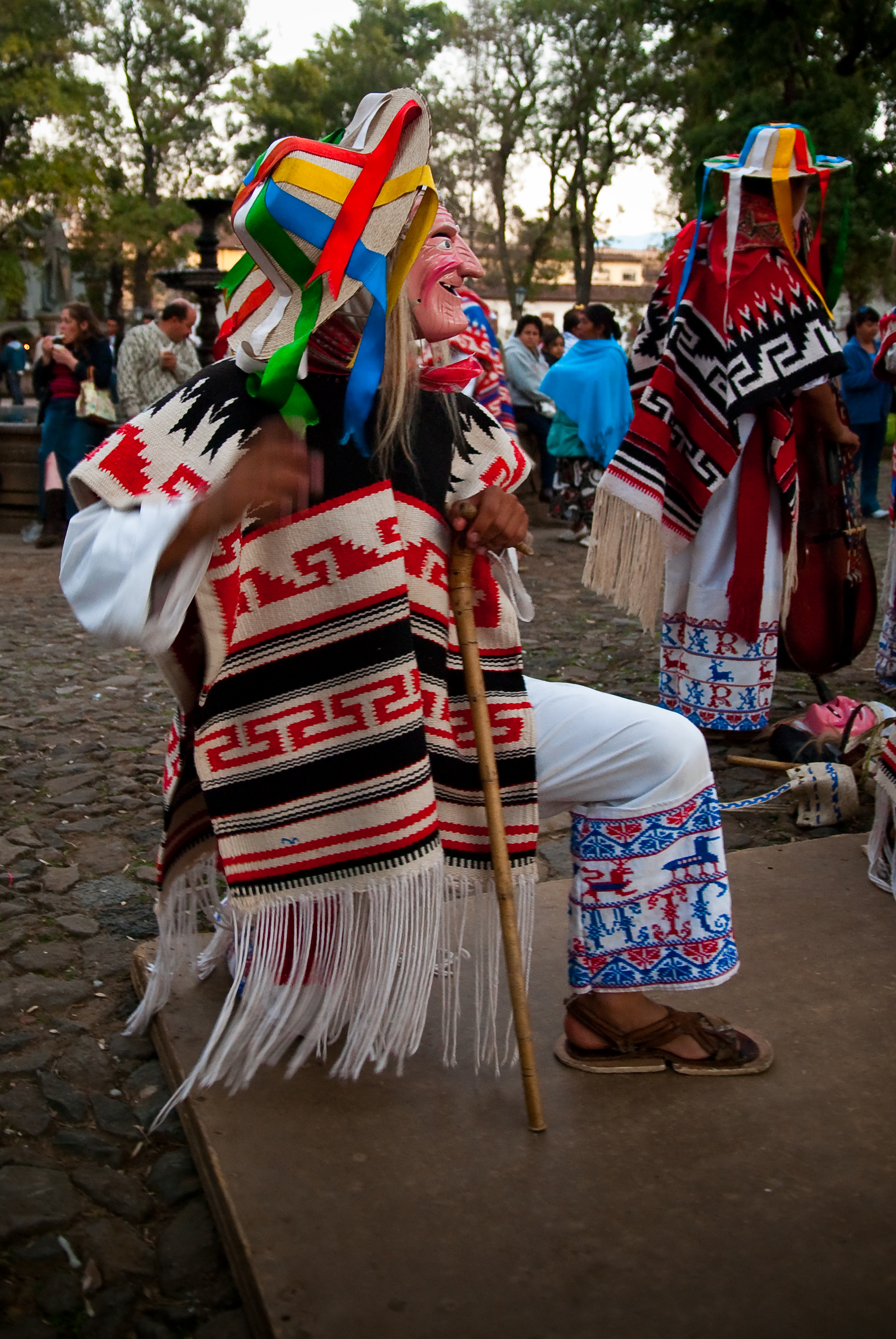
Wooden sole sandals used to make tapping noise.

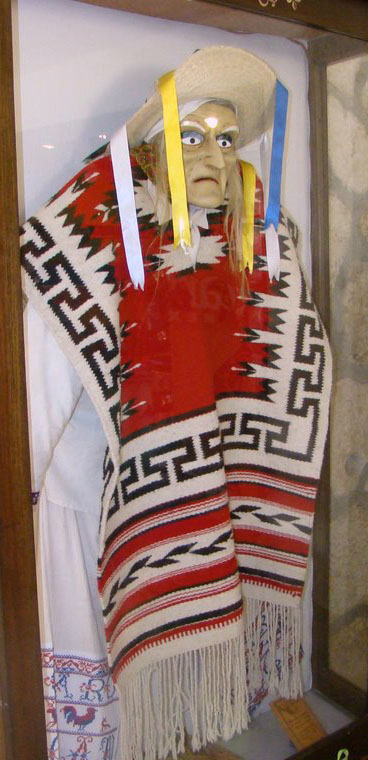
The traditional clothing of a "Danzante."

== Music ==
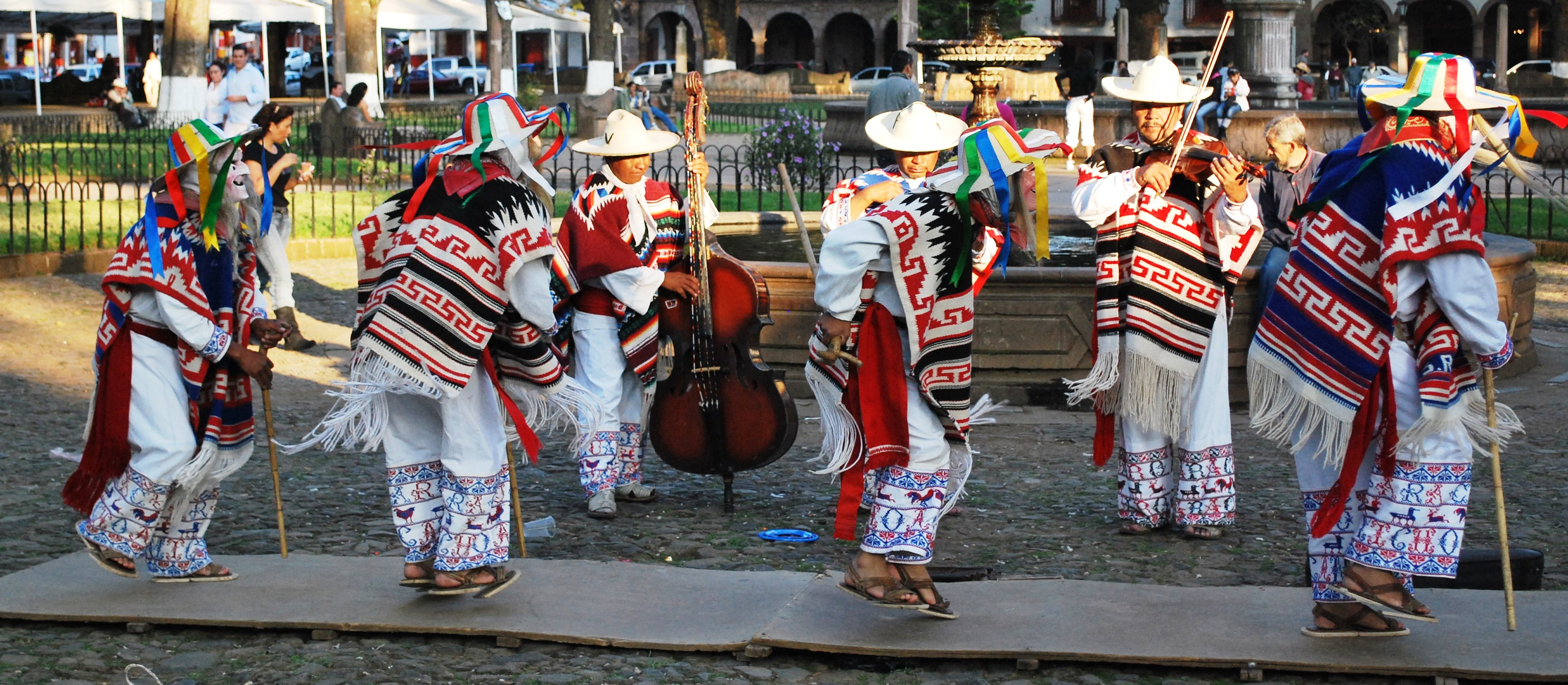
Instruments used for The Danza de los Viejitos

The music consists of 3 instruments.

- Violin
- Clarinet
- Guitar

== Gallery ==
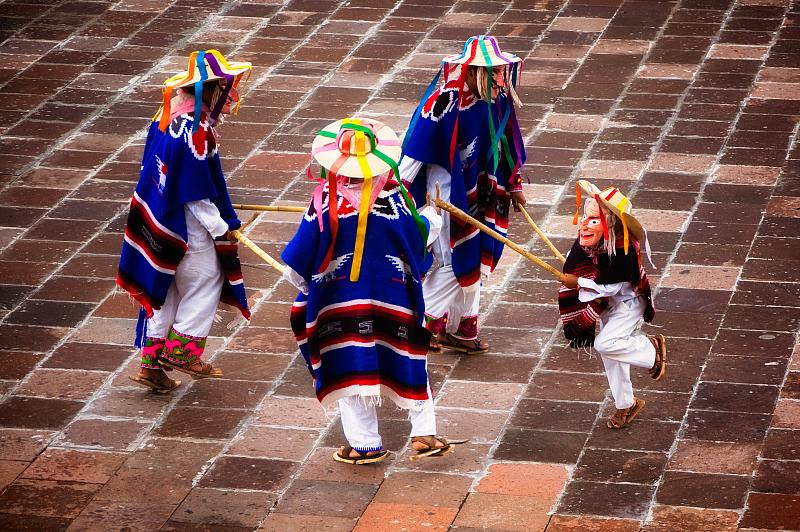
Danza de los Viejitos

Video of Danza de los viejitos, from Michoacán, México

Video of Danza de los viejitos continued, from Michoacán, México
