= Pretty Ladies (female figurines) =

Pre-Columbian female figurines found Mexico in the 20th century

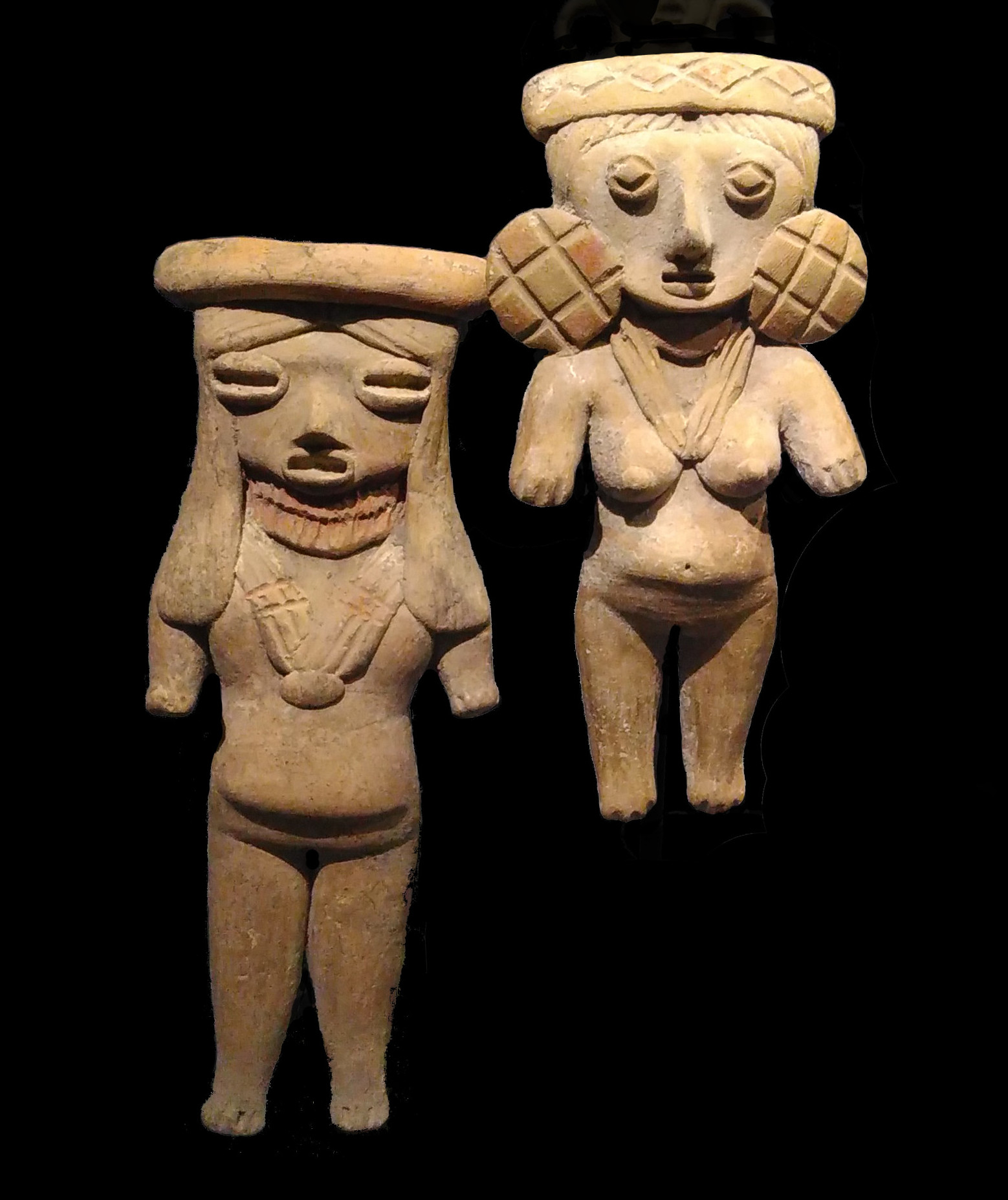
Female figurines found in Mexico in Guanajuato, identified as pre-classic clay figures from the Chupicuaro culture, 400-100 BC, called "Pretty Ladies" by some archaeologists. Part of the collection of the Royal Museums of Art and History in Brussels (AAM 68.14,21,22,24).

Pretty Ladies is the name archaeologists at the beginning of the 20th century gave to pre-Columbian female figurines in Mexico, from the Chupícuaro, Michoacan, and Tlatilco cultures.

== Archaeological research and context ==
The figurines were found in archaeological research at the beginning of the 1930s by Mexican and American archaeologists. It is in fact the discovery of the figurines that led to the discovery of whole sites, like the Tlatlico one.

There are many interpretations of what were the functions of the figures. In some configurations, they were buried with dead bodies to ensure the resurrection of the corpses. They also represented fertility, not necessarily human fertility but also earth fertility.

== Descriptions ==
These figurines were described in different ways, highlighting different aspects:

- "females with large heads, small waists, and prominent hips".
- "naked female with short arms, extended stomach and a fancy coiffure or headdress"

== Naming problematics ==
These figures are also called by archaeologists "naked feminine figures", "nude girls", "topless girls and women" or even "Venus of (Tlatlico, for instance)", which at least one scholar claimed is problematic because in doing so, they projected ideals on the culture these figures were part of, influenced by European representations of beauty.

Also, the naming of clay figures was done in a different way for female and male representations. The equivalent male figures were never called "pretty lords" or "nude men", even when they were as naked as the female figures, but rather "man", "male figure", "chief", etc.

== See also ==
- Tlatilco
- Mexican ceramics
- Royal Museums of Art and History
