= Pinch pot =

Simple form of pottery

A pinch pot is a simple form of hand-made pottery produced from ancient times to the present. The pinching method is to create pottery that can be ornamental or functional, and has been widely employed across cultures. The method used is to simply have a lob of clay, then pinch it to the shape desired.

Pinch pots are the simplest and fastest way of making pottery, simply by pinching the clay into shape by using thumb and fingers. Simple clay vessels such as bowls and cups of various sizes can be formed and shaped by hand using a methodical pinching process in which the clay walls are thinned by pinching them with thumb and forefinger. It is a basic pot making method often taught to young children or beginners.

The process begins with a ball of clay. Thumbs are pushed into the center, and then rudimentary walls are created by pinching and turning the pot. The pot is then pushed on a flat surface to create a flat surface, thereby creating the base. A base can be made by rolling three coils and pressing them together, and then onto the bottom of the pot. Pinched, compressed clay may also be used as a base for building coil pots. The base of the pot is less prone to cracking when formed this way.

== Thumb pot ==
In gardening, a thumb pot is a small pinch pot about the size of a plum, traditionally made from a small ball of clay into which the potter has pushed a single thumb to form the interior of the pot. Thumb pots are now also made commercially in large quantities with machinery instead of by hand. They are typically used to grow plants from seed, to be replanted later in the ground or a larger pot.

== See also ==
- Use in Mexican pottery
