= Mexican ceramics =

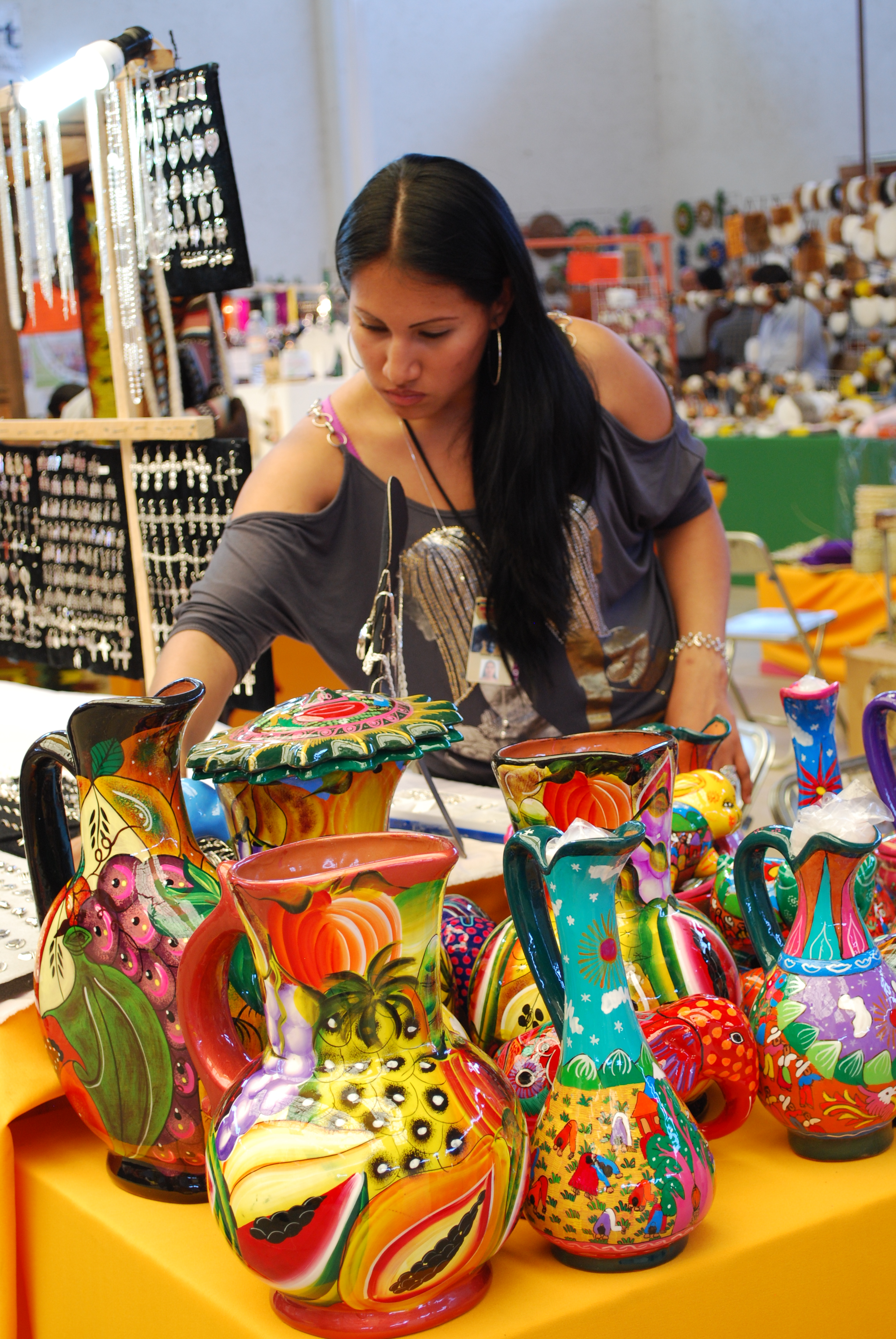
Woman selling pottery items at the Feria de Texcoco, Texcoco, State of Mexico

Ceramics in Mexico date back thousands of years before the Pre-Columbian period, when ceramic arts and pottery crafts developed with the first advanced civilizations and cultures of Mesoamerica. With one exception, pre-Hispanic wares were not glazed, but rather burnished and painted with colored fine clay slips. The potter's wheel was unknown as well; pieces were shaped by molding, coiling and other methods.

After the Spanish Invasion and Conquest, European techniques and designs were introduced, nearly wiping out the native traditions. Indigenous traditions survive in a few pottery items such as comals, and the addition of indigenous design elements into mostly European motifs. Today, ceramics are still produced from traditional items such as dishes, kitchen utensils to new items such as sculptures and folk art. Despite the fame of the prior, the bulk of ceramic items produced in the country are floor and wall tiles along with bathroom fixtures. Mexico has a number of well-known artisan ceramic traditions, most of which are in the center and south of the country. Examples are the Talavera of Puebla, the majolica of Guanajuato, the various wares of the Guadalajara area, and barro negro of Oaxaca. A more recent addition is the production of Mata Ortiz or Pakimé wares in Chihuahua. While the number of artisans has been dropping due to competition from mass-produced items, the production of folk art and fine ware still has an important role in the Mexican economy and the production of pottery in general is still important to Mexican culture.

== History ==
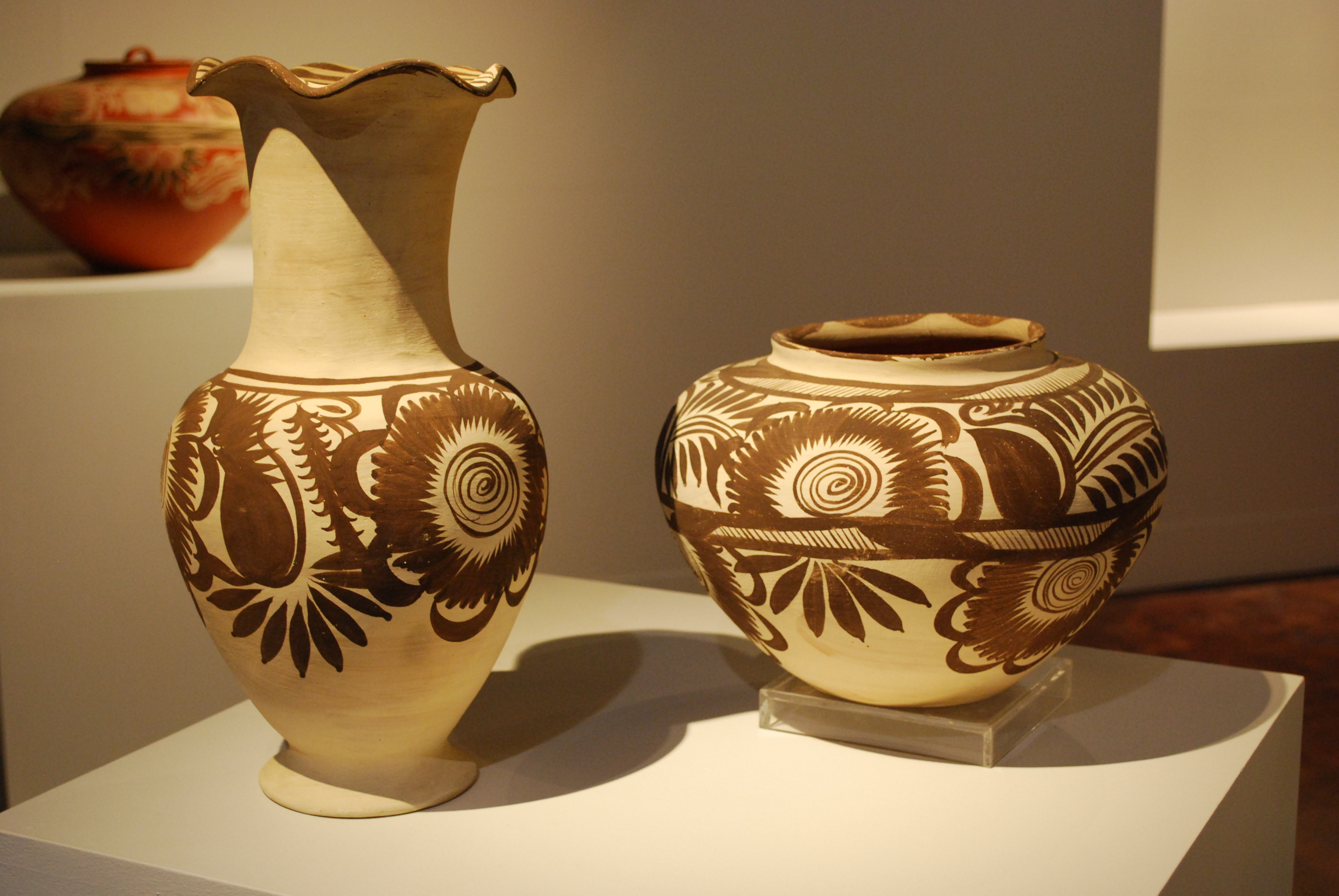
Contemporary pottery by Nicolás Vita Hernández from Chililco, Huejutla de Reyes, in the State of Hidalgo, Mexico, exhibited at a temporary Hidalgo crafts exhibit at the Museo de Arte Popular, Mexico City

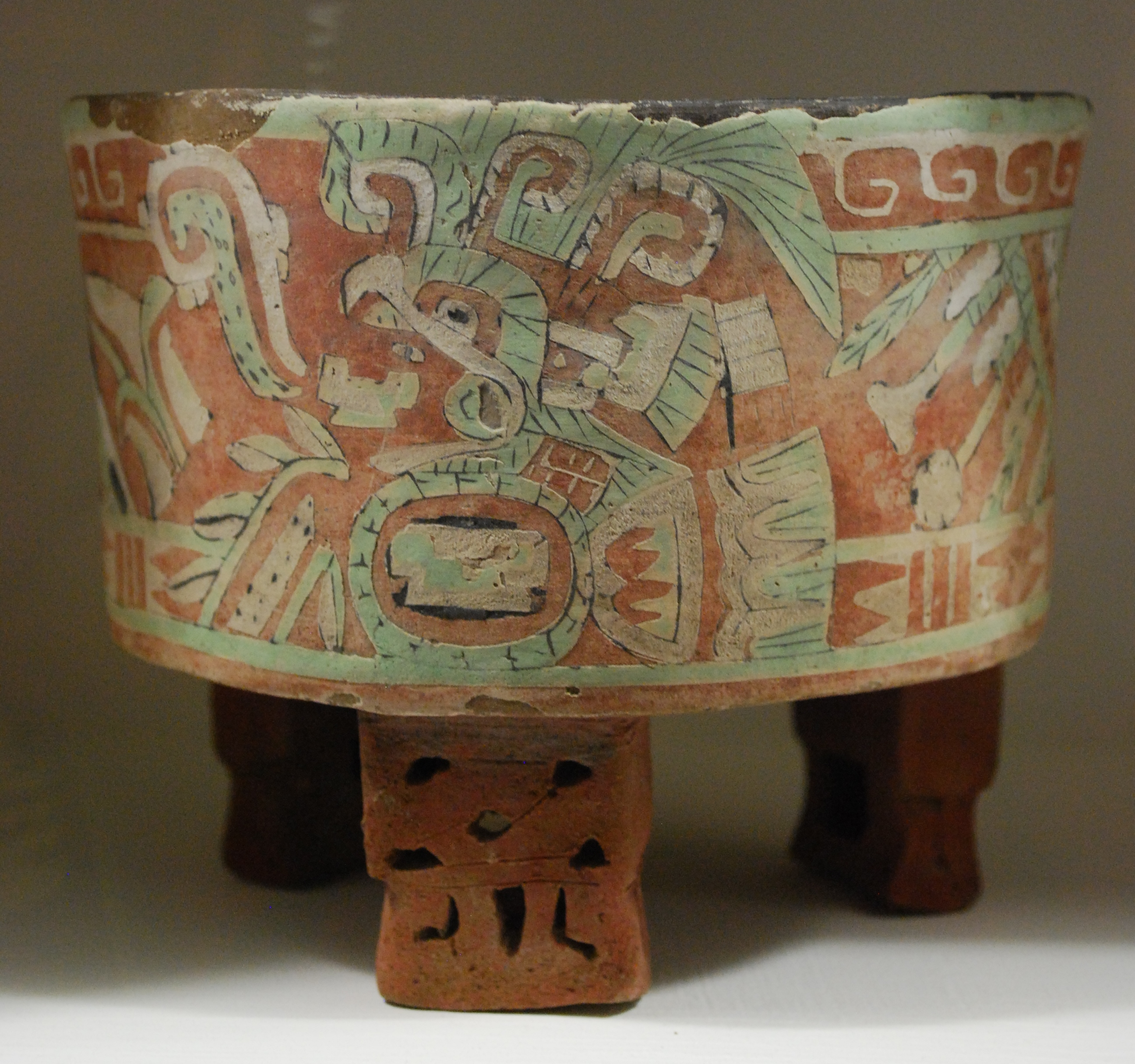
Pre-Hispanic ceramic vessel on display at the Anahuacalli Museum in Mexico City

The making of earthenware began to replace stone utensils in Mexico around the Purrón period (2300–1500 BCE). Many of these first ceramics were gourd or squash shaped, a carry over from when these vegetables were used to carry liquids. This earthenware developed into a pottery tradition that mostly used clay thinly coated with a fine clay slip. Most clays in Mexico need temper to regulate water absorption, with one significant exception being the clay used in the Fine Orangeware of the Gulf Coast.

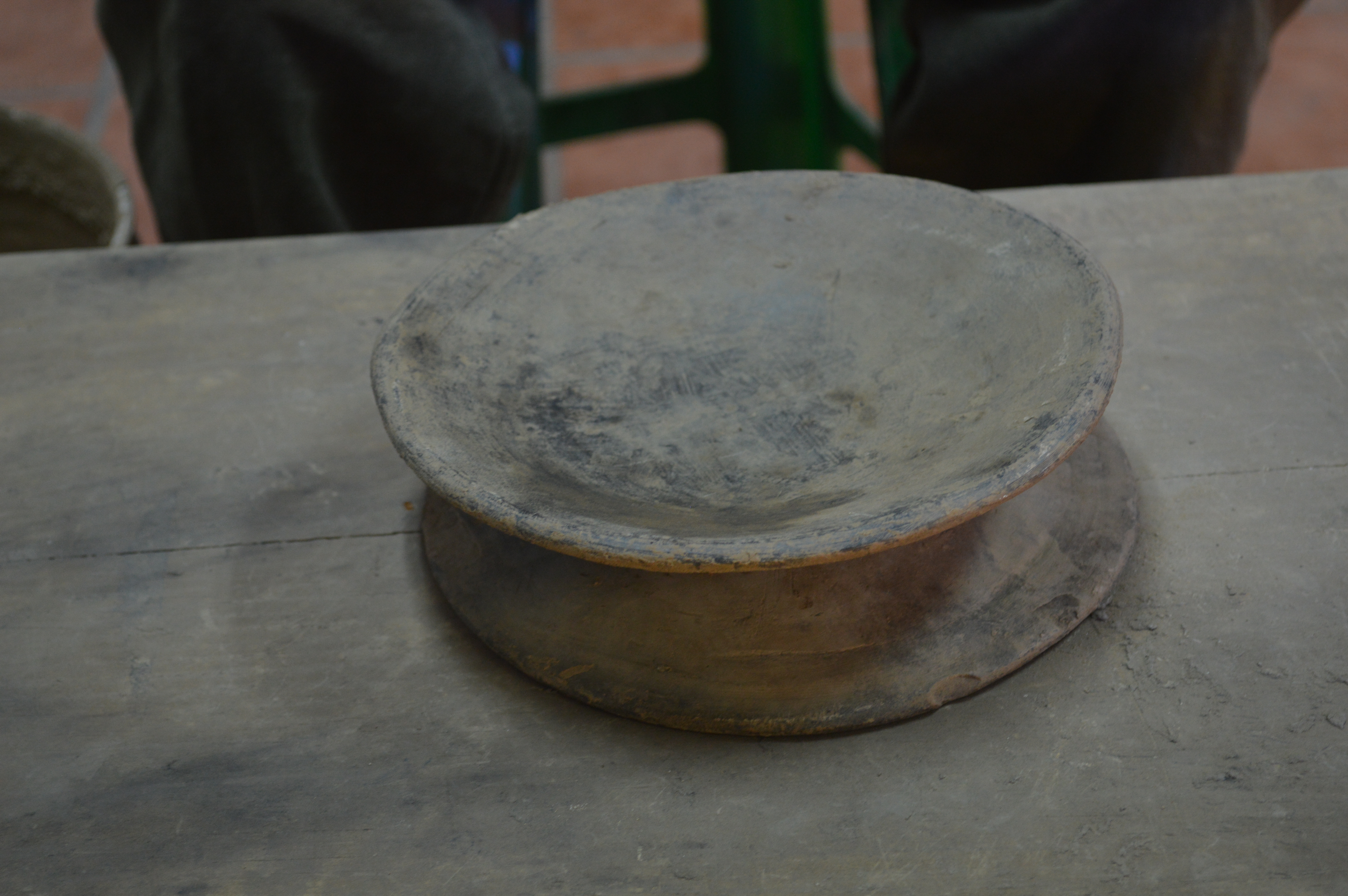
Example of a "proto" potter's wheel at the Carlomagno Pedro Martínez workshop in San Bartolo Coyotepec, Oaxaca, Mexico

Pre-Hispanic vessels were shaped by modeling, coiling or molding. Except for a proto wheel used by the Zapotecs, the potter's wheel was unknown until the Spanish Conquest. Simple pinch pots or coiled pots were usually made by the family, with larger molded pieces made by craftsmen. The earliest molded pieces were simply clay pressed against a pre-existing bowl, but double molds and slip casting came to be used to make bowls with relief decorations. Famous examples of this type exist in Tlaxcala and Puebla states. Many figurines were also made using molds. Sometimes vessels were made with several molded pieces with the upper part finished by coiling.

With one exception, pre-Hispanic pieces were not glazed, but rather the finish was made with a slip made of extremely fine clay. This slip often had mineral pigments added for color, which could be added before and/or after firing. Firing was done in an open fire or in a pit. Figurines were often done in the family hearth. Pots were fired in a heap placed on the ground or in a pit and covered with wood. The use of this method for firing most often led to incompletely fired pots, with the notable exception of Fine Orangeware.

The only glazed ware from Mesoamerica is called Plumbate. It was glazed with a fine slip mixed with lead and fired by a special technique. It was produced only for a short time and its appearance marks the Early Post Classic period at many archeological sites.

There are over thirty known methods to have been used decorate pre-Hispanic pottery including pressing designs into the clay with textiles, use of rocker stamps, or pressing items such as shells and the use of pointed sticks. Various manners of putting and preserving colors both during and after firing were also employed. Designs generally fall into four categories: geometric, realistic or naturalistic (generally stylized animals and people), symbolic and pictographic. Most designs are related to designs on other crafts and on artistic works such as murals. All of these pottery styles and methods can still be found in modern Mexico.

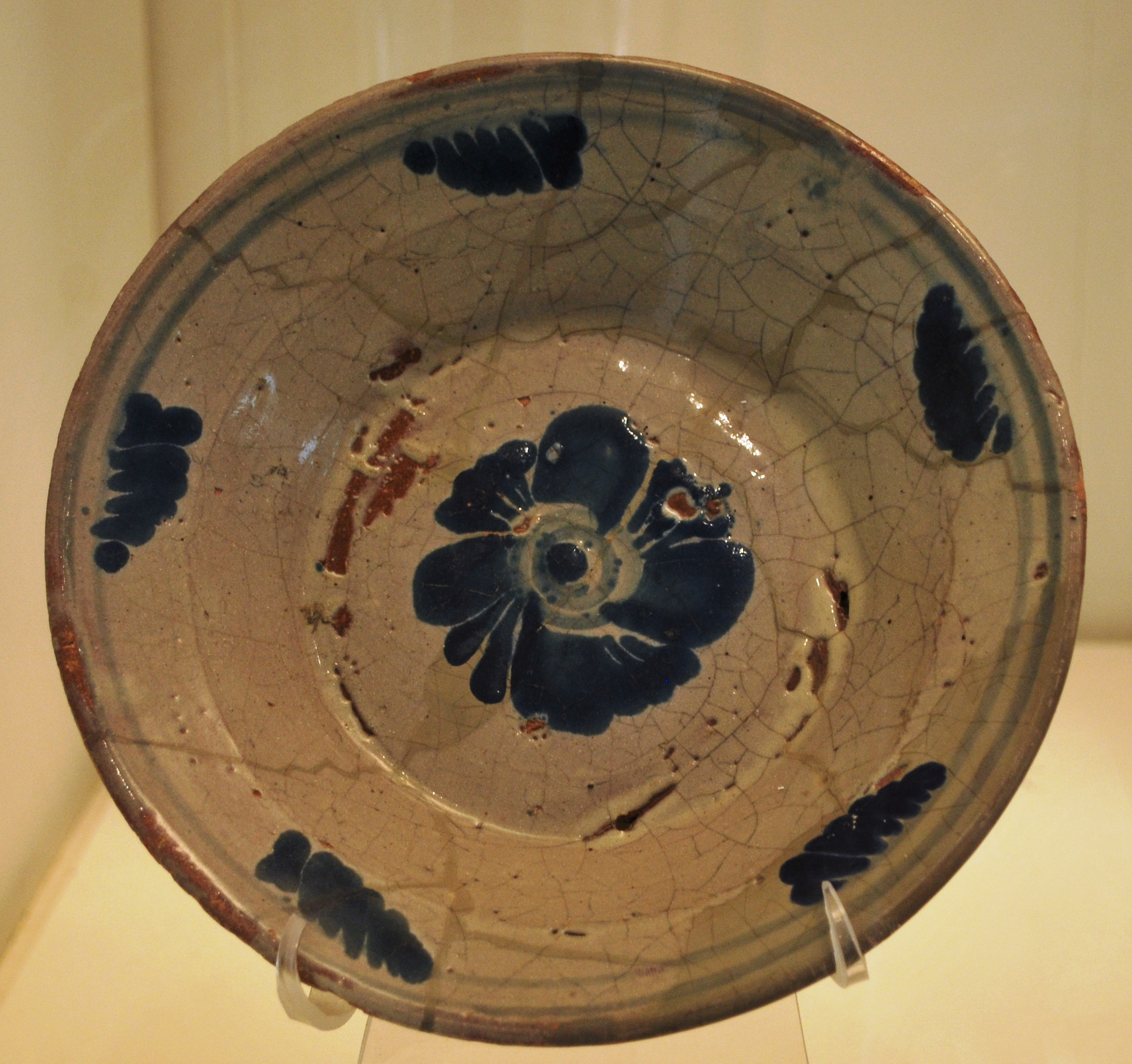
Ceramic plate from Puebla, dated to the 17th or 18th century

The Spanish Conquest introduced European traditions of pottery and had severe effects upon native traditions. Some pottery forms survived intact, such as comals, grinders (molcajetes), basic cooking bowls/utensils and censers. This was mostly done in plain orangeware and some were colored red and black. All pre-Hispanic figurines, since they were almost always related to religion, disappeared and replaced by images of the Virgin Mary, angels, friars, soldiers, devils and European farm animals such as dogs, cattle and sheep. The major effect on production was the introduction of the potter's wheel, the enclosed kiln, lead glazes and new forms such as candlesticks and olive jars. The importation of European and Asian ceramics mostly affected decoration styles of native produced wares. The impact of these was felt earliest and strongest in the central highlands on Mexico, in and around Mexico City. While some traditional pre-Hispanic style ware was still produced in the early colonial, its quality and aesthetics declined dramatically until it nearly disappeared entirely.

European style ware, especially glazed ware, produced by native craftsmen, began early in the colonial period but was poorly done with only two colors, green and amber. Most decorative elements were stamped on with mixed Spanish and indigenous designs. The most common forms were jugs, pitchers and bowls, all for everyday use. Over time, the production of majolica glazed ware, which was expensive to import from Europe, developed and regulated by the mid-17th century. The best was being produced in Puebla, although it was being also produced in Mexico City, Guadalajara, Aguascalientes and other places. These pieces were primarily had a white or cream colored background with designs painted on them in one or more colors. For the rest of the colonial period, indigenous styles continued to deteriorate all over New Spain, while foreign influences from Europe, Asia and the Middle East produced changes in decorations. By the time of the Mexican War of Independence, Mexican majolica was exported throughout the New World and drove the Spanish version from the market. However, this dominance would not last long before cheaper Delftware from England and Asian wares put pressure on the industry in the 19th century. Mexico continued to import and copy styles from France and England through the 20th century; however, there have been native innovations during the past century and a half as well.

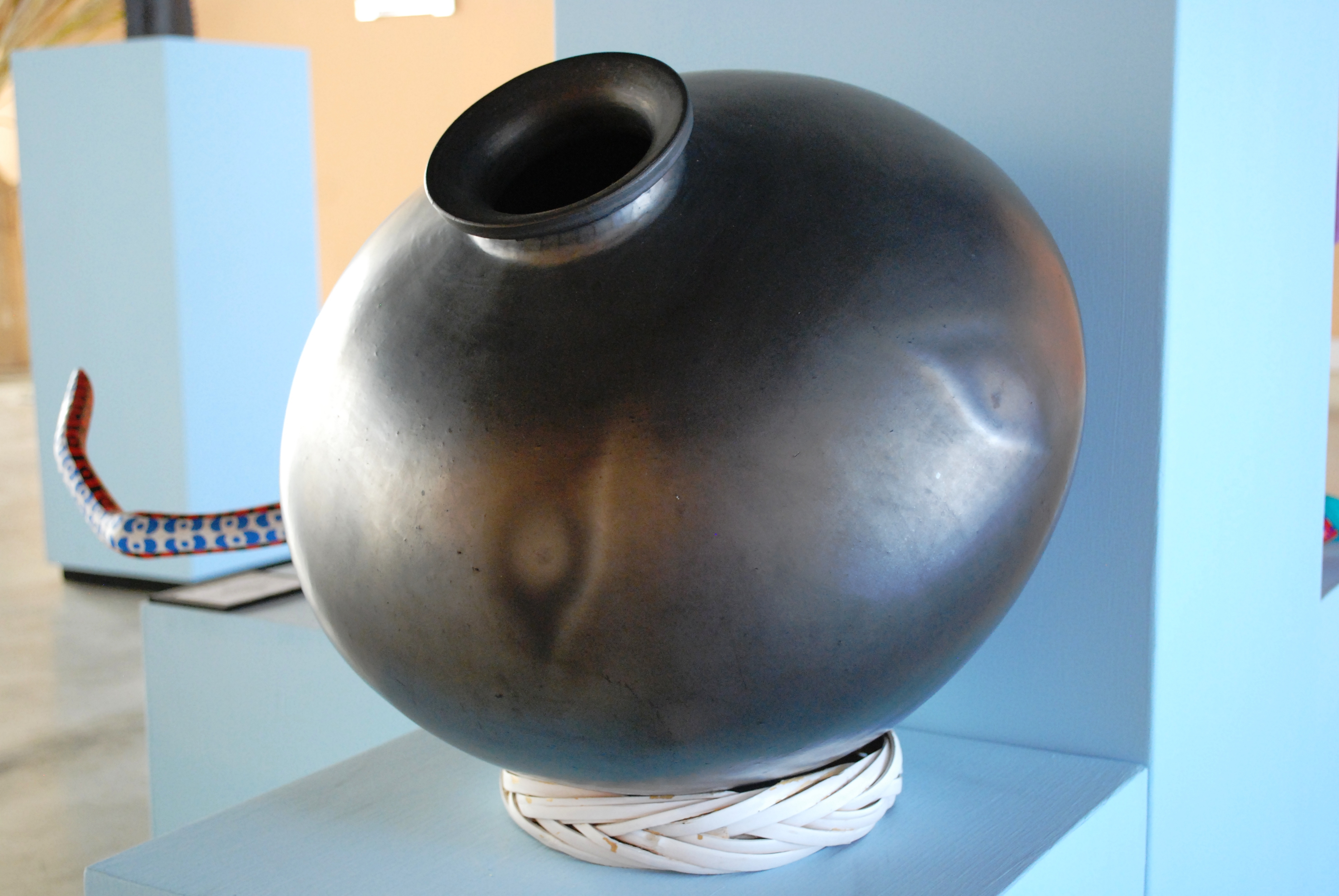
Barro negro cántaro jug at the Museo Estatal de Arte Popular de Oaxaca

Most pottery produced in central Mexico is fired at low temperatures (low-fire) and covered with a glaze made with lead and other minerals. This is because lead will fuse and produce a shine at a firing temperature of less than 800C, while alternatives require temperatures twice as high. The use of lead in these wares has produced health warning in both Mexico and the United States, with the risks being known as early as the late 19th century. Lead from the glaze tends to leach into foods after repeated use. Use of this type of ware has been linked to elevated blood levels in children in Mexico City, Oaxaca and other places and severely high levels in children of potters. The lead content is highest in Oaxacan pottery. This lead content has blocked most rurally produced ceramics from the United States market, where they could fetch much higher prices.

In the 1990s, FONART, a government entity that promotes handcrafts and several non-governmental organizations worked to produce an alternative lead-free glaze what works with low-fire ceramics. This glaze is based on boron. They have also worked to get artisans to install US$40 fans in their kilns to make combustion more efficient. This has allowed a significant portion of low-fire ceramics to be stamped "lead free" and allows them to be exported.

However, researchers have found lead content in wares stamped "sin plomo" (without lead). Even though the boron glaze costs less than the traditional lead glaze, many potters refused to change tradition. In all, only half of Mexico's potters have switched. In some places the problem is the lack of information about the glazes and in some places, artisans claim that they need government financial support, especially for options that warrant a gas-fired kiln. Another problem is that many do not trust the government and ignore warnings.

== Pottery production ==
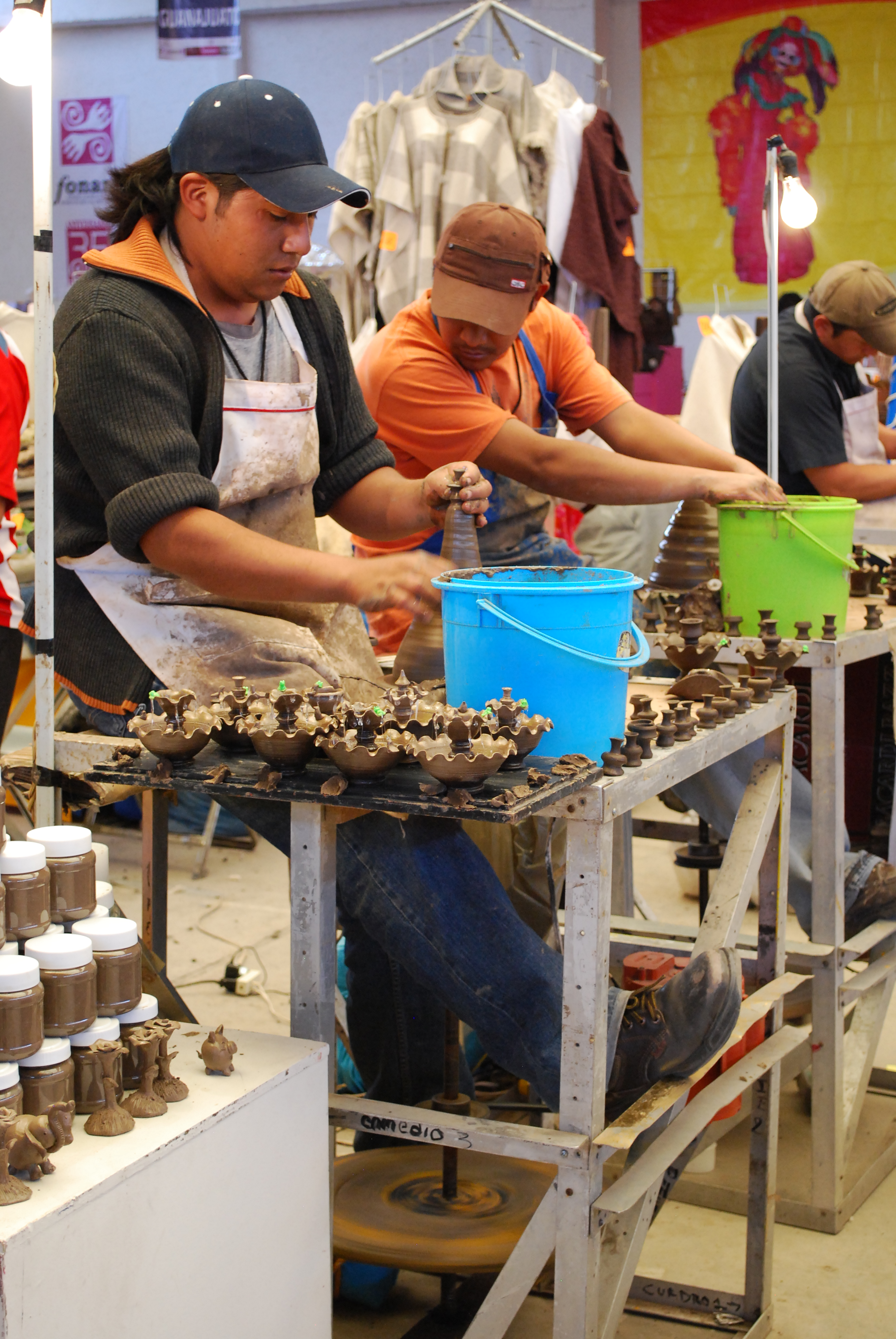
Potters at work in the crafts section of the Feria de Texcoco

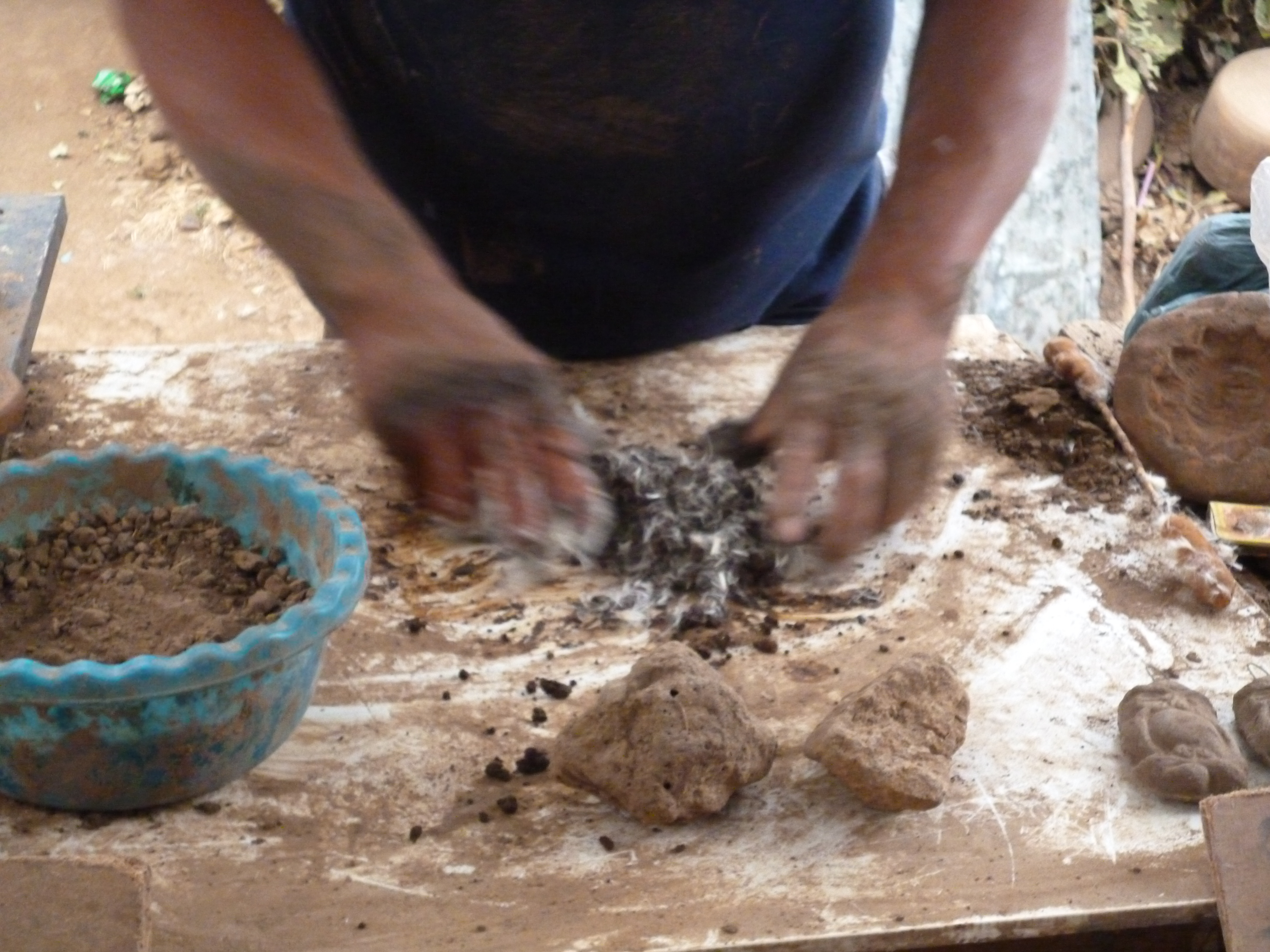
Mixing cattail fluff, used as temper, into clay in Morelos, Mexico

Ceramics is the most practiced craft in Mexico. Shapes and function of the pieces vary from simple flat comals, used for making tortillas to elaborate sculptures called Trees of Life. The most basic forms, such as comals, cazuelas (a type of stew pot), simple bowls and other cooking and storage ware are still based on native designs and forms. Decorative ceramics and figures are almost completely dominated by European traditions, especially in central Mexico. In some cases, there is a blending of traditions, mostly in decorative designs where indigenous elements are combined with European elements.

A relatively new tradition in ceramics is called "folk art". These pieces are mostly decorative, such as figures, tiles; and fine wares such as casseroles, teacups, and dishes. These are produced for the Mexican upper class, the international market, and to some extent, tourists. Folk art production is encouraged by government at all levels, with a large number of artisans now signing at least their best pieces. While this segment of the market keeps ties with the past, it is also sensitive to fashion trends as well. This leads to experimentation with new decorative elements and the disappearance of those that do not sell.

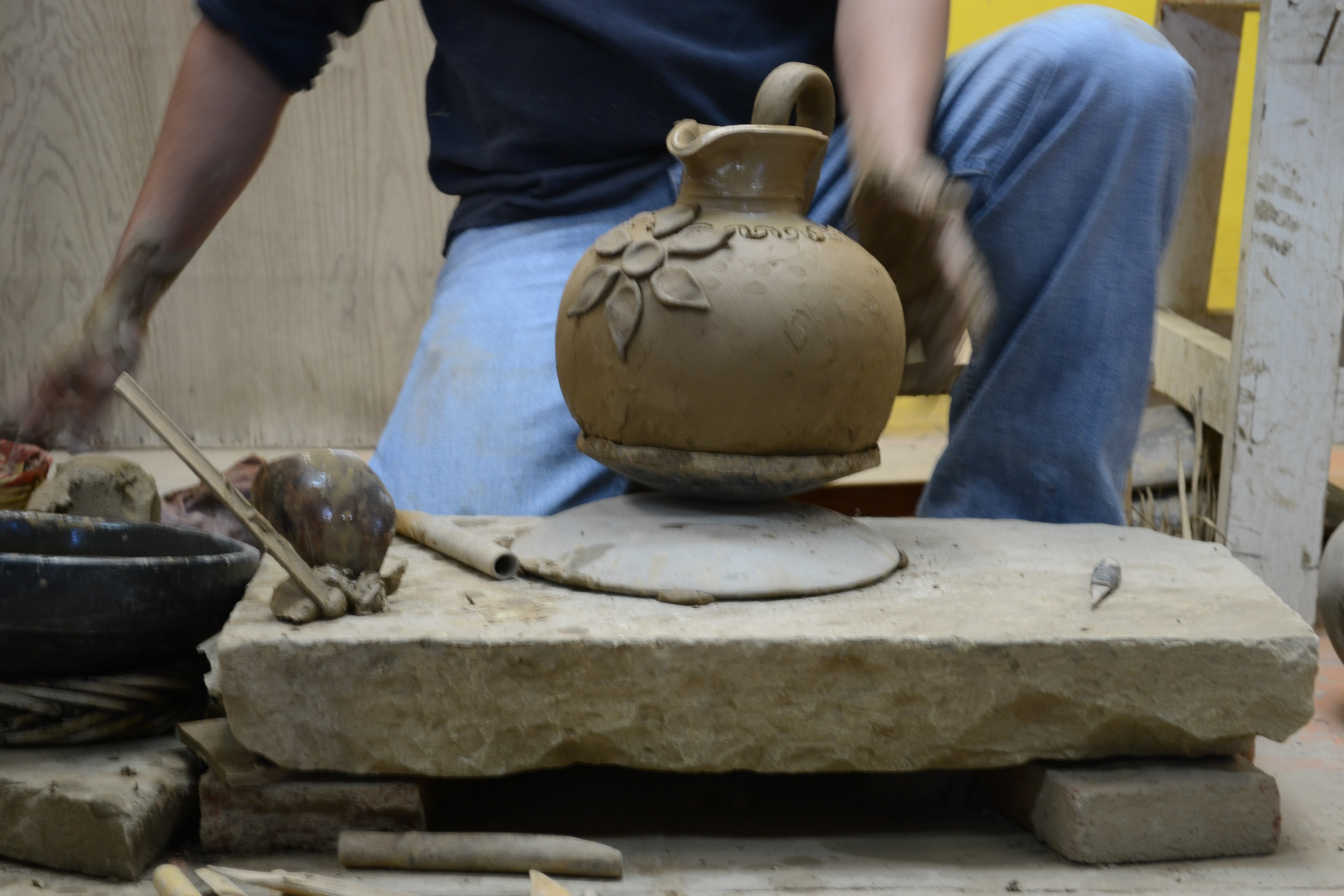
Making of a barro negro pottery piece in San Bartolo Coyotepec, Oaxaca, Mexico

Imperfections in pieces are less tolerated in local Mexican markets than in some foreign markets. The reason for this is that mechanized production of near perfect copies is still a relatively new phenomenon, so the imperfections that show something was made by hand do not have the "charm" they might in more industrialized countries.

Most potters work in family workshops, with everyone participating in the process. Pottery making families tend to be secretive about their practices and rarely cooperate with anyone outside the family for any aspect of the pottery making process. Superstition may surround the process, especially firing, with potters taking care to avoid "the evil eye" of neighbors and building small shrines and performing Christian and indigenous blessings. Both men and women mold pieces, but men generally do the largest pieces (due to weight) and do the firing. Children begin to work with clay when they are about six, molding decorative elements. They usually begin molding pieces when they are about fourteen, mastering it by about eighteen. The male head of a family workshop is often of retirement age, whose primary purpose is instruction and supervision. However, many of these workshops are disappearing as elders stop working entirely and children seek other, more profitable careers.

Mexican potters generally use local clays, digging it up themselves or paying someone to bring it by donkey or truck. The kind of temper used varies on location, from cattail fluff in Metepec, to sand in Acatlán or kapok in Ameyaltepec to give the clay the right consistency and it keep the final product from cracking. In some cases feldspar is used. The clay comes in chunks, which must be dried and then crushed, using a rolling stone or flail. Some potters in Metepec put the chunks on the street in front of their house and let the cars drive over them. Another way to remove impurities and use the finest is to disperse the clay in water, with impurities and rougher sediment falling to the bottom.

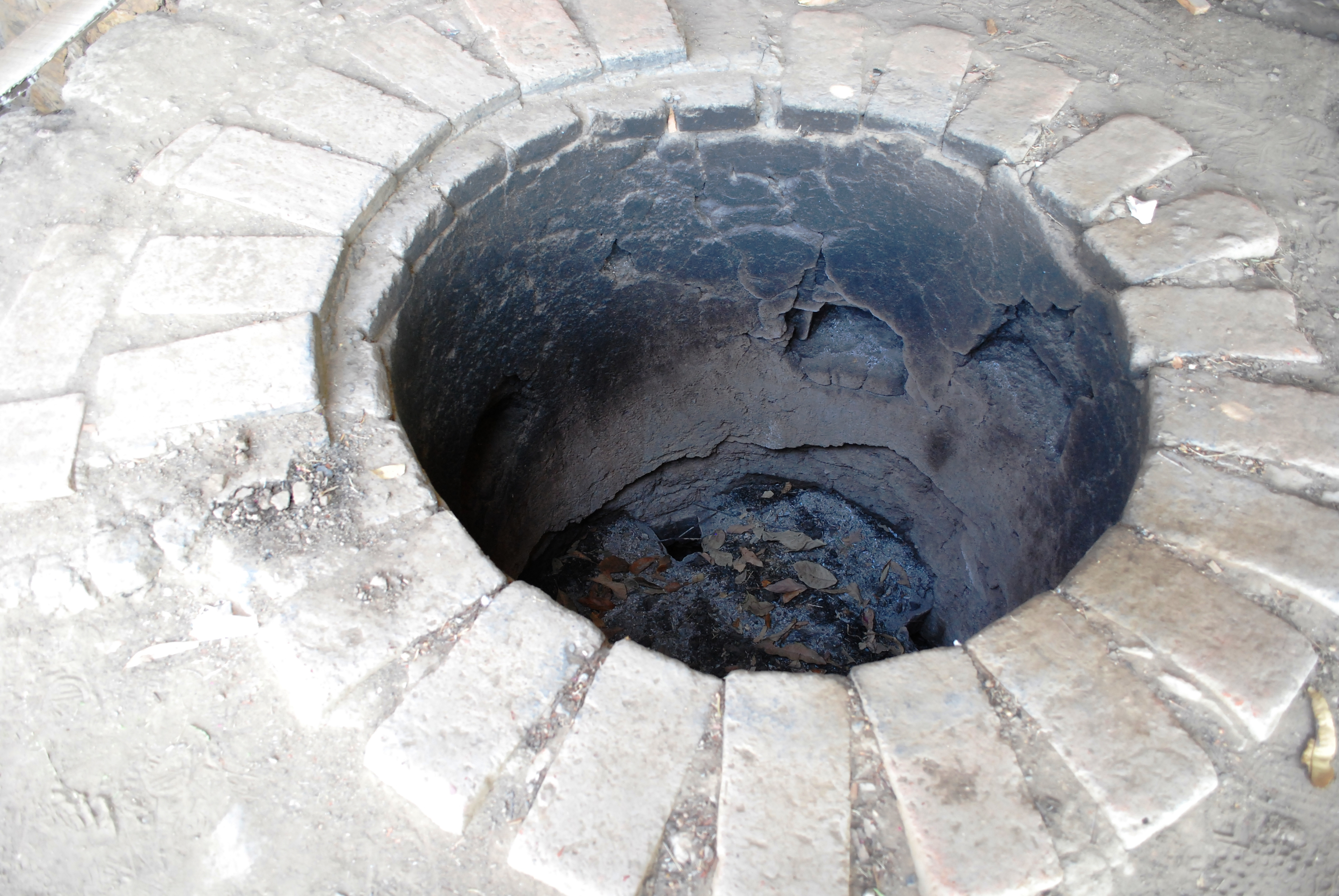
Looking into the kiln used at the Doña Rosa workshop in San Bartolo Coyotepec, Oaxaca, Mexico

All of the methods used in pre-Hispanic times, along with the potter's wheel, are still used to make pieces. Coiling is usually limited to finishing a piece that has first been pressed into a mold. Molding is the most common way of forming enclosed vessels. Most of these molds are concave or convex, with the clay pressed against the inside or outside of the mold. Sometimes liquid clay is poured into plaster molds. Potters wheels are most commonly used in some workshops, and often to rapidly make a succession of small vessels. Their use is more common in Guanajuato and Jalisco than other parts of the country. In many places, the wheel is powered by foot, using a kickwheel, rather than by electricity. Hand turned wheels are also used. In Oaxaca, a type of proto-wheel has been used by the Zapotecs since pre-Hispanic times. This is a saucer balanced over an inverted saucer that is turned to help shape the piece. It is most often used for the barro negro pottery made in San Bartolo Coyotepec.

Both glazed and burnished pieces are made in modern Mexico, with both leaded and nonleaded glazes used. If the piece is to be burnished, it is usually covered in a slip, then polished with a stone or a piece of metal. Both indigenous and European pottery traditions employ decoration, which can vary from simple color changes to elaborate images and designs painted on and/or pressed into the piece. Coloring agents used to be made by the potters themselves, but today most use purchased chemicals.

Traditionally, pieces have been fired in wood-fueled kilns or simple in a pile with wood. This is low-fire method as the temperatures achieved do not exceed 800 °C. Better wood kilns and gas kilns can reach temperatures of between 900 and 1000C, which is not quite yet high-fire, but allows the use of more types of low lead or lead free glazes. Another reason for the higher temperatures is that wood is becoming scarce in parts of Mexico and gas kilns easily achieve these temperatures, which produce better pieces.

Bodies requiring higher firing temperatures, such as stoneware were introduced in the late 1950s even though it had existed elsewhere for centuries. These wares are considered to be much finer than what can be achieved at lower temperatures. A pioneer in the making of stoneware in Mexico is Jorge Wilmot, who began with Ken Edwards in the 1950s and 1960s. Later, a group in Mexico City began to experiment with stoneware, calling themselves Cono 10. While the group no longer exists, their work, both as a group and later as individuals has had a significant effect in the development of stoneware in Mexico. Ceramics fired at higher temperatures came to the interest of the government, especially FONART, in the 1970s. This agency installed suitable facilities in various parts of the country and trained potters in the techniques. Many of these later started their own workshops. Stoneware is still relatively rare and unlike other forms of pottery, it is usually made by professionals with education rather than people in rural areas. Some of the best known stoneware workshops include those of Hugo Velazquez in Cuernavaca, Taller Tecpatl in Guanajuato, Alberto Diaz de Cossio, Graziella Diaz de Leon and Francisco Javier Servin M., all of Mexico City.

== Major pottery traditions in Mexico ==
=== Oaxaca ===
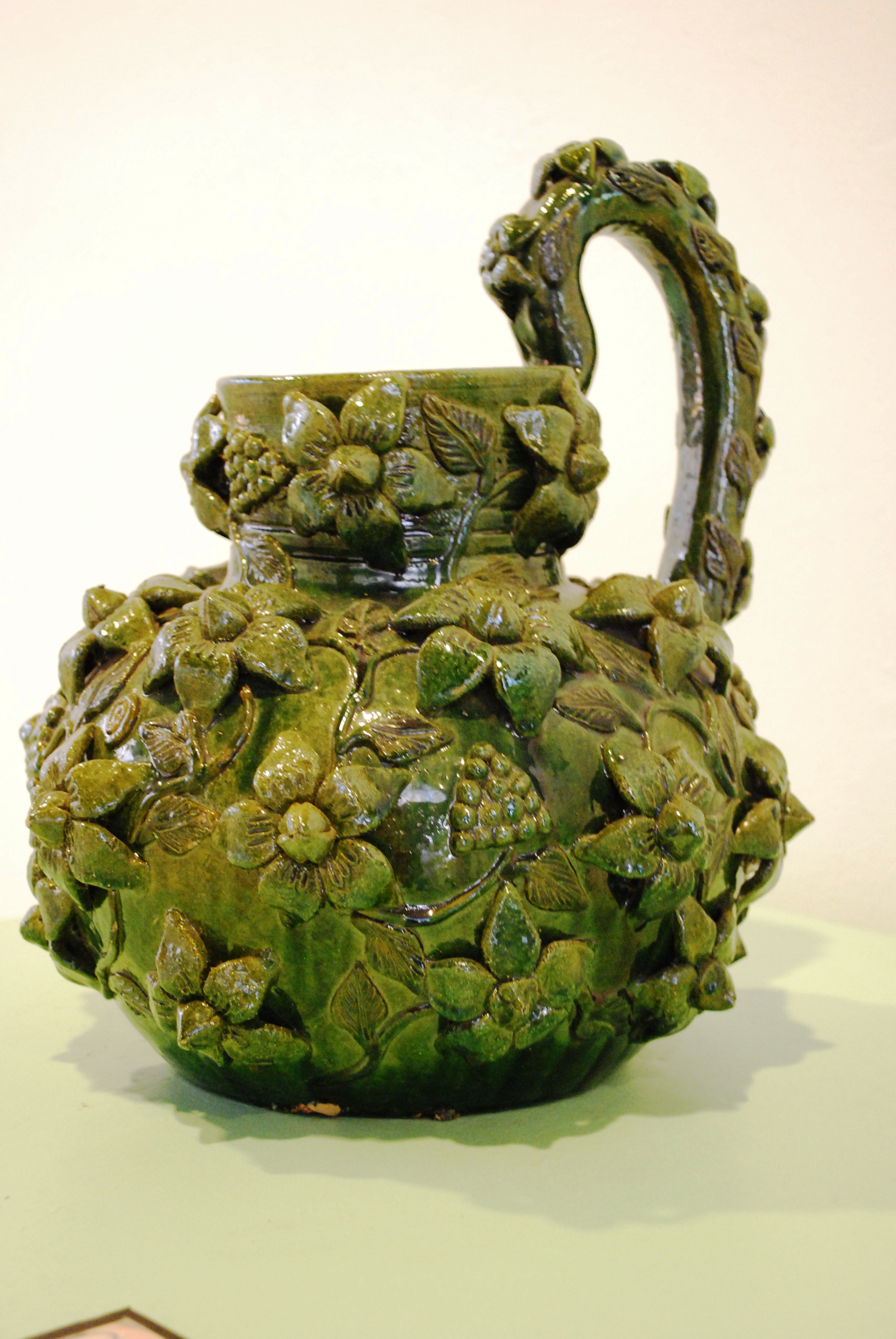
Example of the green glazed pottery from Santa María Atzompa, Oaxaca, Mexico

In many parts of Oaxaca state, both functional and decorative pottery and ceramic pieces are produced. Most potters live in the central valleys region of Oaxaca, where some of the best known traditions are. The most traditional potters live in small rural villages such as San Marcos Tlapazola and Vista Hermosa Tonaltepec. The latter is a Zapotec village of about a dozen families, who make very simple, yet light, earth colored cookware and utensils. Most of this pottery is sold to other local villages, but a small regional and international market for this type of pottery has appeared as well. Many Oaxacan villages, like San Marcos Tlapazola, are nearly devoid of working age men, as most have left to work in the United States. Many of the women have begun to make pottery to supplement what their husbands send. Much of the work is sold in the larger towns or cities either by the potters individually or together as a cooperative. The cooperative at Tlapazola sells and exhibits their ware in markets and contests in various parts of Mexico. Most clay is from a local source and generally that source is kept secret. Despite their price, as low as thirty pesos for a pot, much of traditional indigenous cookware is being replaced by mass-produced pots and pans in the rural areas. Fewer young people are taking up the trade, mostly because many want to live in the city. Much of pottery making in Oaxaca has switched from functional ware to decorative wares that appeal to foreign markets and tourists.

Some Oaxacan artisans draw on the native use of bright colors and magic realism present in modern works such as those by Rufino Tamayo and Francisco Toledo. Others show a world view that mixes native beliefs and traditions with the Catholic faith. Most potters cannot compete with cheap, mass-produced items so many have turned to upper scale folk art and one-of-a-kind pieces. Others have been inspired to look at their own ancient cultures and use them to help create sellable works. Cooperatives such as these have attracted the attention of Japanese ceramists and billionaire financier Alfredo Harp Helú, who have provided seed money, business advice and outlets to show their wares internationally. Despite this, becoming profitable is still not easy.

Many Zapotec potters still use the "Zapotec wheel" to give shape to their pieces. It is not a potter's wheel per se. It is a disc or plate balanced over another inverted one. The piece is given its basic shape by coiling or molding and then it is finished while turned on the disc. The disc with the vessel in progress is turned only with the hands, which requires a certain amount of balance and skill.

One common way to decorate the simplest of ceramic pieces in Oaxaca is called "chorreada" (runny). The pieces are first fired with a clear glaze. Then a second glaze with oxides for color are dabbed on and allowed to run where it may. This double glazing is similar to the production of 19th century Majolica, a pottery form more prominent in central Mexico. The use of raised images on clay items has also been adapted to more traditional vessels, often with the image colored differently from the background.

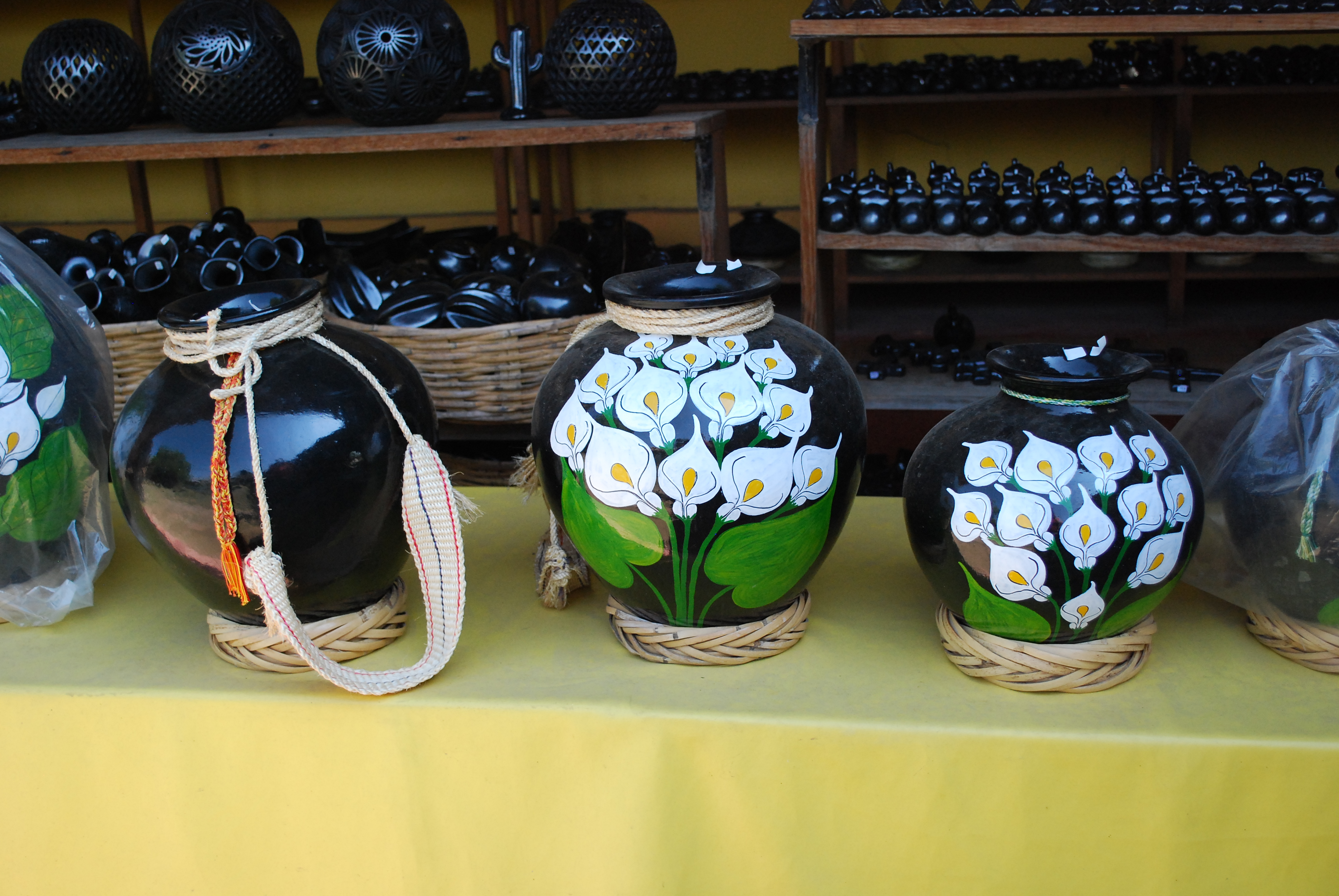
Wares for sale at the Doña Rosa workshop in San Bartolo Coyotepec, Oaxaca, Mexico

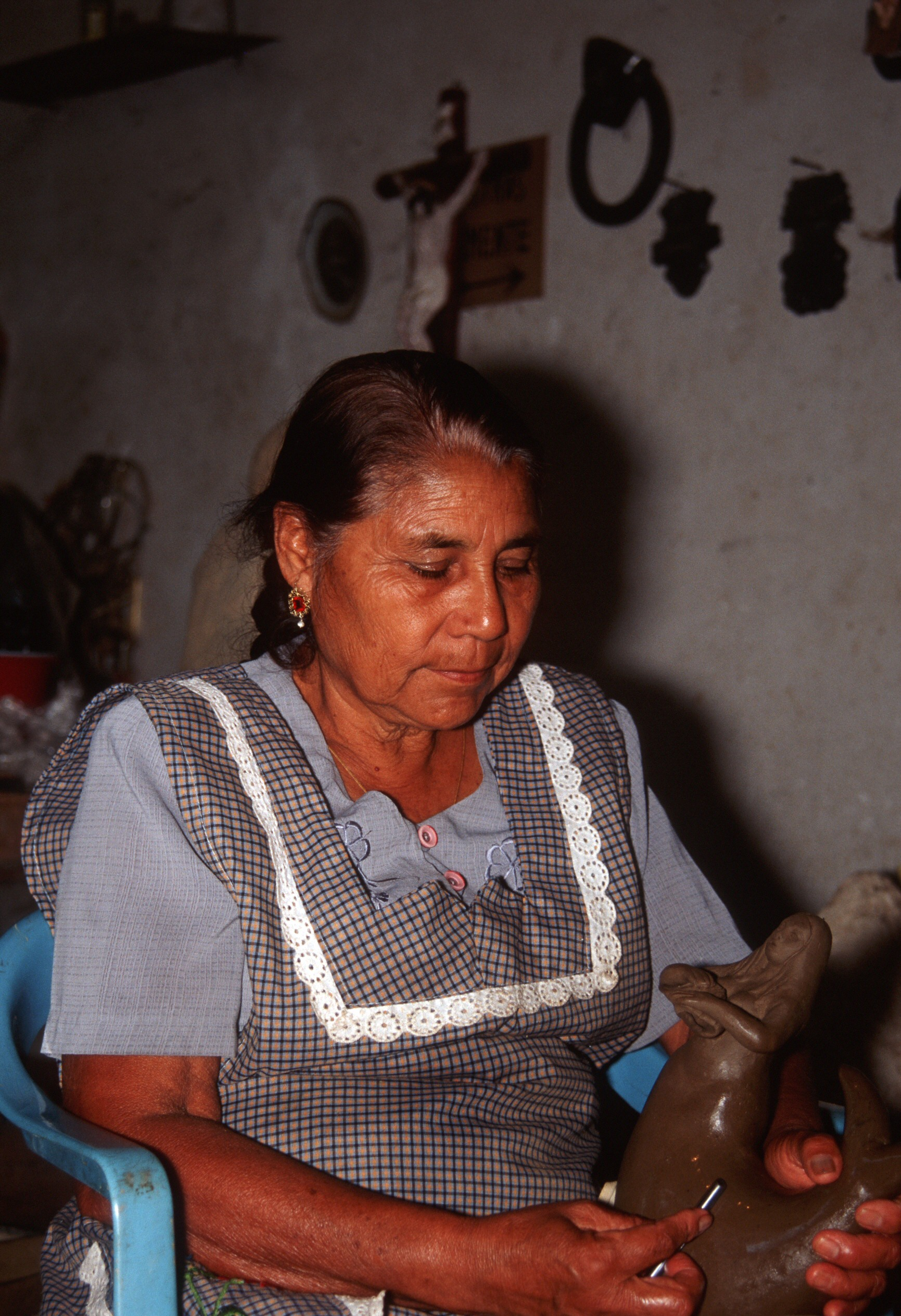
Glafira Martínez Barranco, artisan from Oaxaca

The two best known pottery traditions are "barro negro" and the green-glazed pieces of Santa María Atzompa. Barro negro (black clay) pottery is a style of pottery distinguished by its color, sheen and unique designs, and is most often associated with the town of San Bartolo Coyotepec. The origins of this pottery style extends as far back as the Monte Albán period and for almost all of its history, had been available only in a matte grayish black finish. In the 1950s, a potter named Doña Rosa devised a way to put a black metallic like sheen onto the pottery by polishing it. This look has made the pottery far more popular. While the Doña Rosa's techniques and designs are now widely copied in Oaxaca, the original workshop still exists, with her son Valente Nieto Real still making pieces at seventy years of age. From the 1980s to the present, an artisan named Carlomagno Pedro Martinez has promoted items made this way with barro negro sculptures, which have been exhibited in a number of countries.

The town of Santa María Atzompa is known for its jade green-glazed pottery, which has been made the same way for generations. The color comes from the lead monoxide glaze that is applied to it. Atzompa's pottery tradition prior to the Conquest is similar to other settlements in the area, but after the Spanish introduced glazing techniques the green variation was adopted and has changed little since. Up until the mid 20th century, the ware was popular enough to be shipped to all parts of Mexico and even to the United States. However, restrictions against lead containing pottery has since deflated this market and it is mostly sold only locally. Despite the development and introduction of lead-free glazes, Atzompa continues to have some of the highest lead content in Mexico, found both in the wares and in the potters and other people who live there.

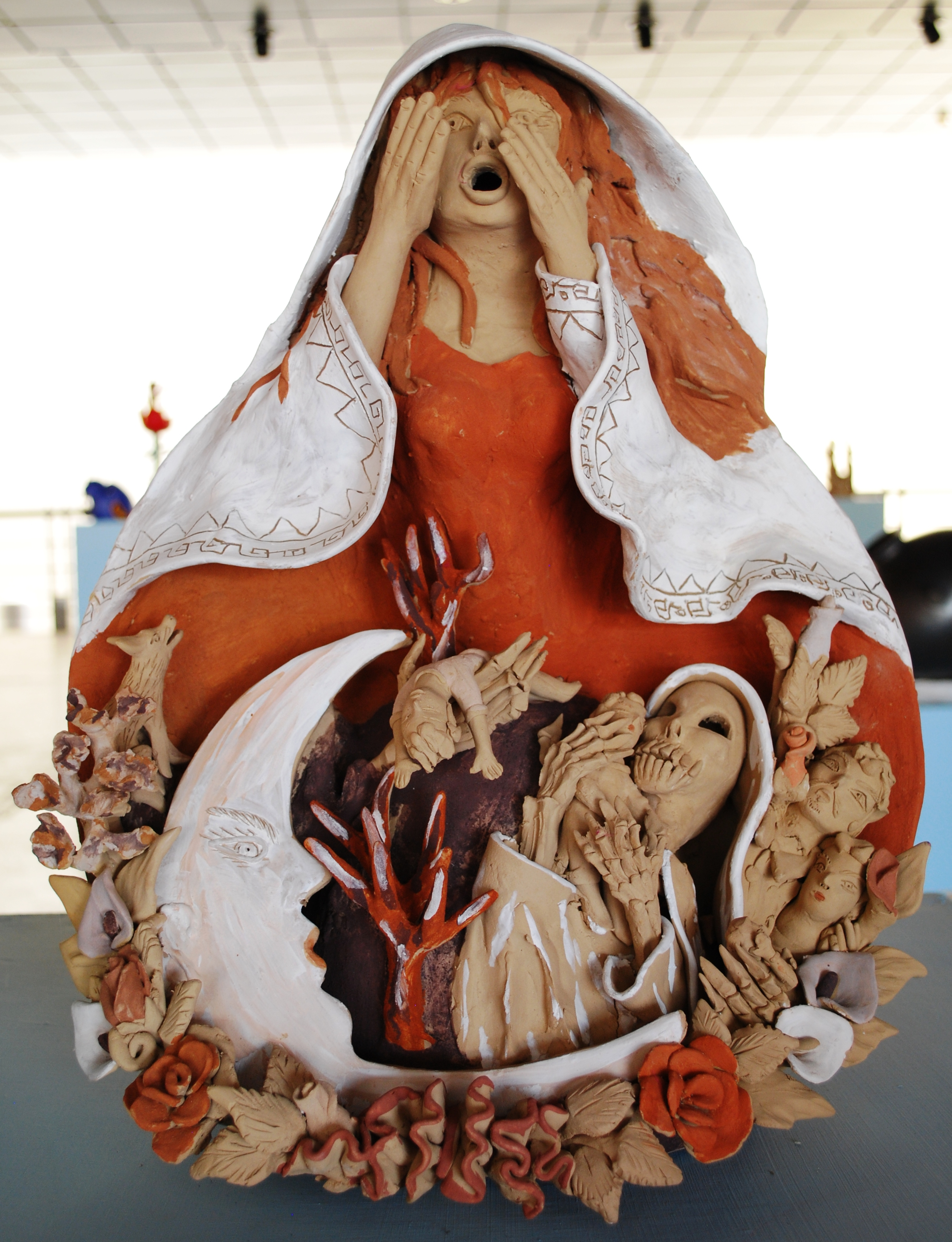
"Duelo" by Angelica Vásquez Cruz of Santa María Atzompa, Oaxaca, Mexico

While the green glazed ware continues to be Atzompa's staple product, there has been some innovation in their pottery tradition.

A number of potters in Atzompa have turned to crafting clay figures, most notably the Blanco family. The late matriarch Teodora Blanco Núñez developed a distinct style of terra cotta figures she called "muñecas" (dolls). Teodora typically made female figures and anthropomorphized animals, and she occasionally made male historical and religious figures. Teodora ornately decorated her pieces with small detailed pieces of clay before firing. These small details are called "pastillajes" (frosting decorations). Teodora Blanco Núñez died in 1980, but she taught the craft to all her children. The oldest son, Luis García Blanco makes figures called "muñecas bordadas" (embroidered dolls) with long skirts that reach the floor, eliminating the need to create breakable feet. They are elegantly adorned with earrings, necklaces and their dresses are decorated with elaborate floral designs. Usually the women have two thick braids, like Luis, and often carry a basket on the head. Blanco works are generally unpainted with almost all decorative details sculpted in clay. The style has been imitated and reinterpreted by other artisans.

In the 1970s, a local potter by the name of Dolores Porras gained notoriety when she went against convention and pioneered the production of multicolored glazed pottery. She studied sculpting with Teodora Blanco Núñez and learned the delicate pastillaje technique. Once she had her own workshop, she taught herself how to paint on clay pieces, starting with red and white washes. Later she added blues, greens, grays and oranges. Her pieces sold well and other potters imitated her work. Later on, she introduced the use of lead-free glazes. Today, her pieces are part of Atzompa's pottery traditions even though her works are outsold by wares from younger potters.

Angelica Vasquez Cruz is known for her figures of women, mermaids and angels. Vasquez is a single mother who raised four children, making money and a name by the making of these figures. She has won numerous awards for her intense and intricate work. Her clay images are almost always focused on a strong female figure. The large pieces are "Byzantine" like, shaped like a Christmas tree and decorated with tiers of thumbnail miniatures. Each piece is unique and can take months to make. The colors are produced by mineral pigments from local rocks. The pieces are bought by collectors, who pay $US175 to 800 per piece in galleries. The pieces cost about half that in her workshop.

In Ocotlán de Morelos, the best known pottery family is headed by the Aguilar sisters. The dynasty began with their mother, potter Isaura Alcantara Diaz. Isaura learned the traditional pottery making techniques of the Oaxaca Valley, which was mostly limited to making utilitarian items. She began to experiment with figures and more decorative pieces, with some of her pieces making their way into the Rockefeller collection, but unfortunately she died prematurely at the age of 44. Before she died, she taught potting to her children Josefina, Guillermina, Irene, Concepción and Jesús. Due to their mother's death, the children began working early, with Josefina being only seven. Poverty prevented the children from attending school. Like their mother, they began and mostly made pots and other kitchen utensils but they also worked to develop clay figures. Over time, these siblings became renowned for their fanciful painted clay figures that celebrate everyday life. Today, these siblings still work and much of the third generation are craftsmen as well. Some, such as Demetrio Garcia Aguilar, are making a name for themselves as well.

Outside of the central valleys, the city of Tehuantepec also as a significant pottery tradition. The most distinctive aspect are the figures of women, which average about a meter tall and have on their heads a shallow pan of sand to set a water storage jar. Miniature figures based on these are similar in design but are often painted in accents of white and gold. These are called "tanguyus" and are created to be given as gifts to mark the end of the year.

=== Jalisco ===
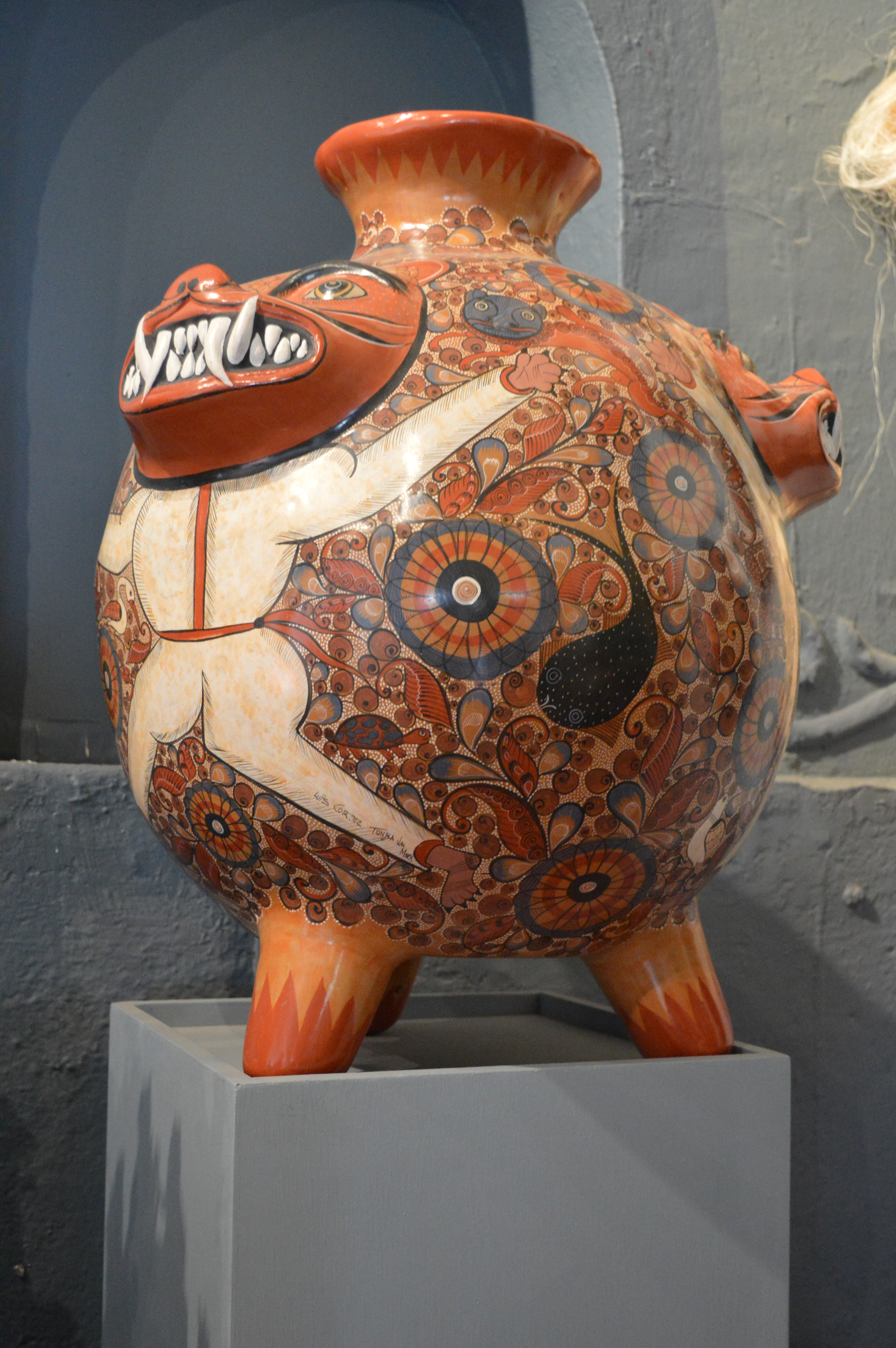
Large ceramic container at the Museo Nacional de la Cerámica in Tonalá, Jalisco

A wide variety of traditional low temperature and higher temperature firing techniques are used in the Guadalajara area, to produce ware from cheap objects to artistic productions. The two main pottery producing municipalities are Tonalá and Tlaquepaque. These two municipalities produce several different types of pottery and ceramics, principally "bruñido", "bandera", "canelo", "petate", "betus" and high-fire/stoneware. The best known of these styles is bruñido, which translates to burnished. It probably descends from polychrome produced in this area en the 19th century. The name comes from the fact that these pieces are not glazed, but rather they are given a slip and then polished with a stone or pyrite. Many of these pieces are slender necked jugs or lamp bases, often decorated with animals, such as rabbits, with distorted characteristics, giving them a surreal look. The pieces are usually painted with delicate tones of rose, gray-blue and white on a background of a light coffee color, light gray and sometimes green or blue. Each piece is individually created. The attraction of this pottery is its appearance, as it is too porous to hold any liquid or food. One exception to this are thick large tubs mainly to store water or for bathing. Water stored in this kind of vessel takes on a flavor from the pottery, which is desired by some people. Another exception is a water container with a fat body and long neck, with a ceramic cup placed upside down over the neck. These are called botellones, and are similar to carafes. One town that specializes in these is El Rosario, near Tonalá.

Bandera, which means "flag" in Spanish, is so named because it has the green-red-and-white colors of the Mexican flag. Red is commonly used as the background color, while the green and white are used for the decorative details. It is also an unglazed burnished ware. For unknown reasons, this style of pottery is very rare.

Petatillo pieces are distinguished by tightly drawn lines or crosshatching in a red background. These lines are named after straw mats called petates, which they resemble. Above the lines are drawn stylized images of plants and animals, especially deer, rabbits, eagles, roosters and swans. Often the main figures are banded in black and spare use of green completes the set. This ware is painted before firing, glazed, and then fired again. It is very labor-intensive and rare, and is mostly used on platters. A giant urn in this style can take up to three years to complete.

Canelo is named after the color of the fired pottery, which is various shades of cinnamon (canela in Spanish). It is popular and used mainly for water jugs because it is good for keeping liquid cool.

Betus pottery is characterized by vibrant colors that give the ceramics a whimsical look. This style derives its name from the betus oil the clayware is immersed in before it is fired. The oil, which is made of a resin extracted from pine trees, gives the painted pottery a brilliant sheen.

One uncommon ware is called engregado. These objects have a special varnish that make them useful for cooking, the varnish acting like a coating of Teflon that prevents food from slicking when heated.

High fire wares like alta clay and stoneware were introduced to the area by American Ken Edwards and Mexican Jorge Wilmot starting in the 1960s. These are fired at over 1,100C, causing the clay to vitrify and form a nonporous surface. The first stoneware kiln was installed in Tonala and spread from there.

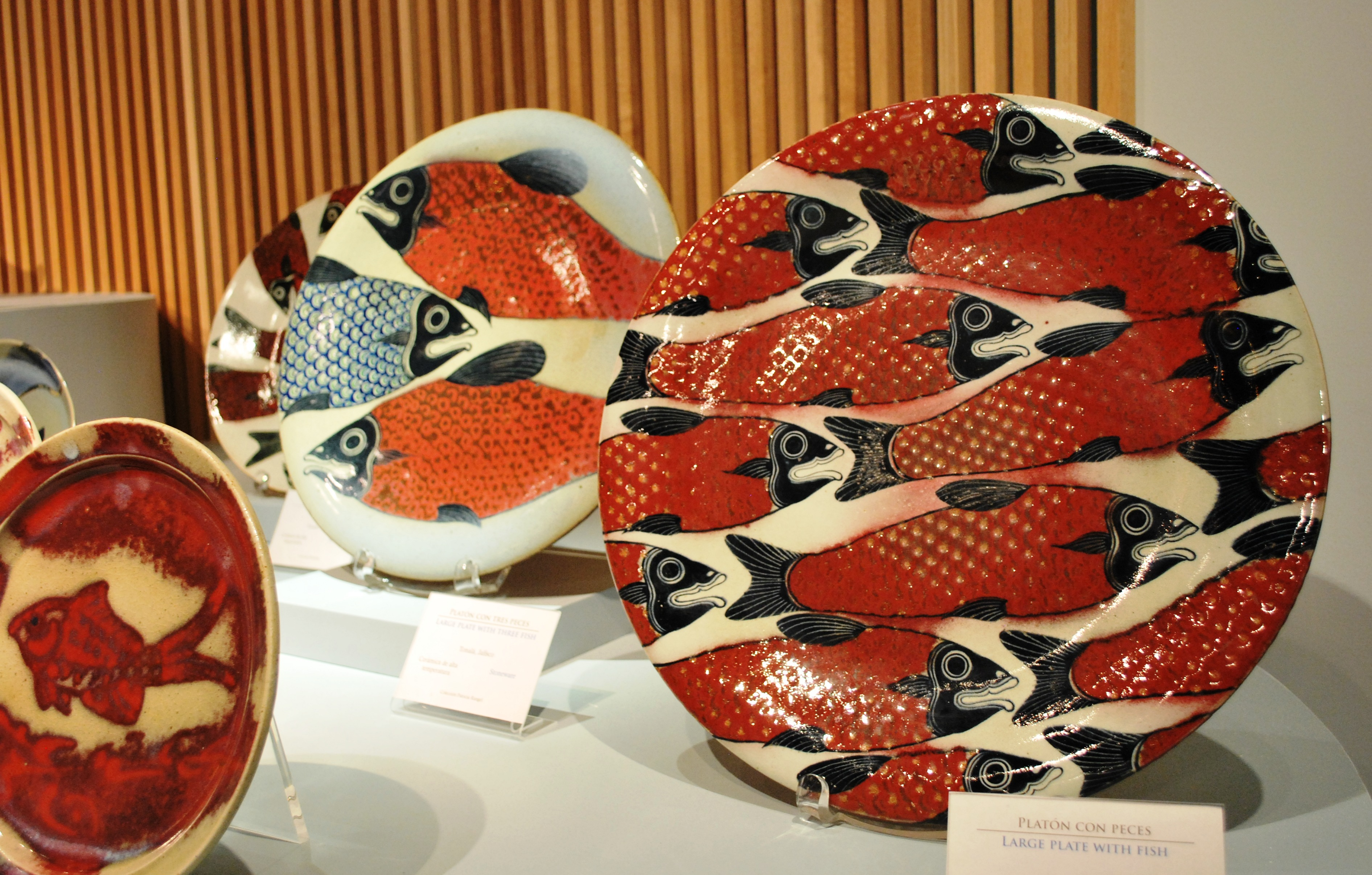
Stoneware plates with fish from Jalisco

Stoneware is produced by El Palomar and some other factories in Tlaquepaque. Another high-fire ware is of the white kaolin type by factories such as Loza Fina and Cerámica Contemporánea Suro. The latter is a family run operation that caters to chefs, designers, architects, and artists. The workshop primarily make dishes in all shapes and sizes, but items such as lamps and decorative pieces as well. The pieces are generally made to order based on designs preapproved by the client. Orders range in size for a setting for four to the entire dish set for restaurants. Many of their clients buy wares in bulk although there is no minimum.

About 2,000 artisans such as Jose Garcia Quinones in Tlaquepaque preserve the tradition of making nativity scenes and other figures from clay. These nativity scenes can be whimsical with non-tradition animals such as lions and giraffe and even the Devil can appear. Garcia Quinones has won prizes for his work since he was a boy and each year for thirty year has sold his wars at the annual Christmas Bazaar at the Deportivo Venustiano Carranza sports facility. Like other potters, the pieces are made at a home workshop with all members of the family contributing to the creation. Another potter, Justino Estuvier, over 70 years old, exports his finely crafted wares to Spain. However, this aspect of the ceramics industry is fading in the municipality with far fewer potters than there used to be. Common artisans here battle to survive against the proliferation of plastic and cheaper ceramics from Asia. The average handcrafted nativity scene sells in Mexico for 350 pesos, when cheaper mass-produced ones sell for 160.

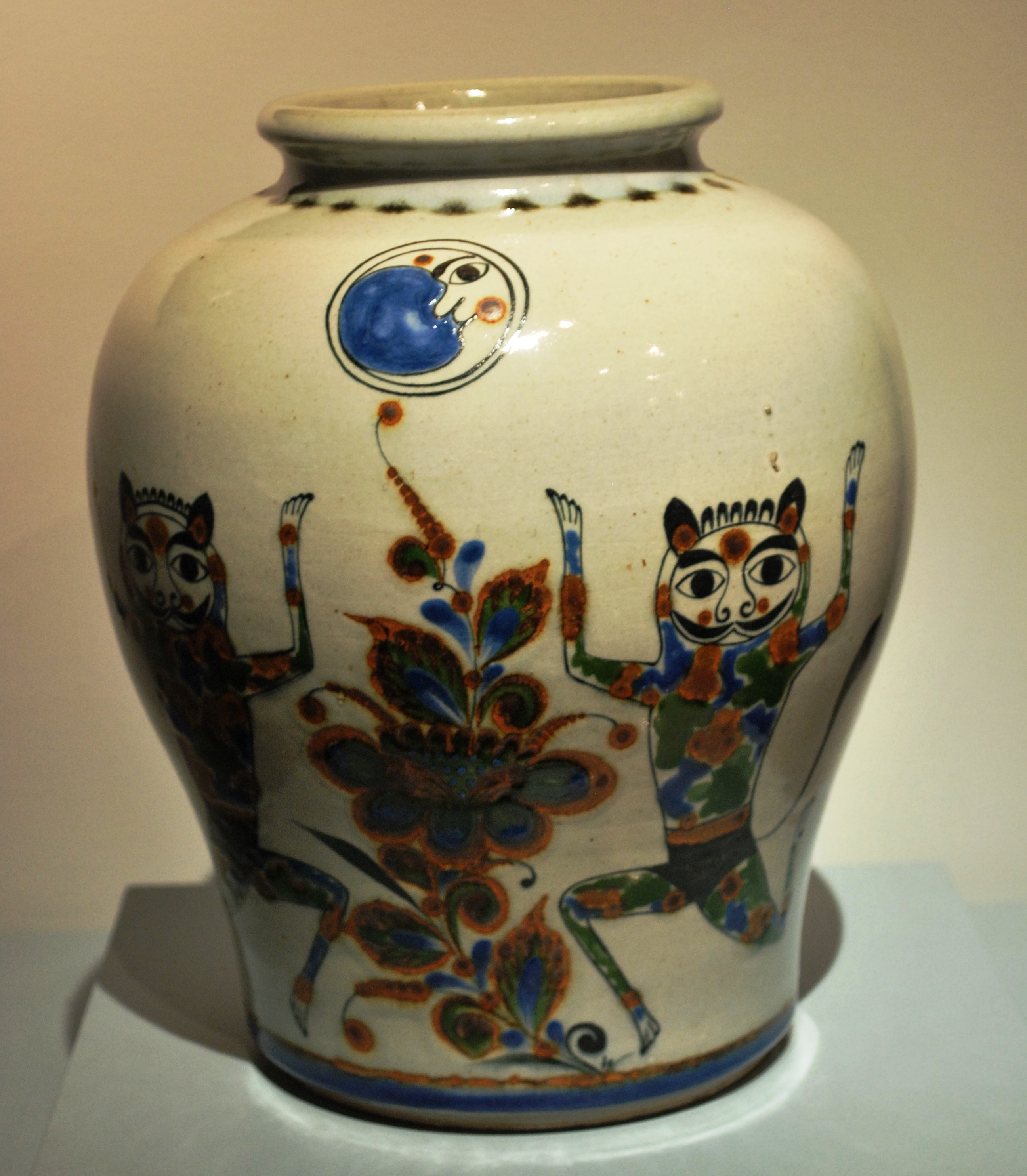
Stoneware vase with nahuals from Jalisco

Tlaquepaque hosts the Museo del Premio Nacional de la Ceramica Pantalen Panduro (Pantalen Panduro National Ceramics Prize Museum), which exhibits the prizewinners of the annual national prize given to ceramics makers. It is located in the Centro Cultural El Refugio and was created in 1997. The first annual Premio Nacional was awarded in 1977. Today there are prizes for various categories but the most sought after is the Galardon Presidencial (Presidential Recognition), which is signed by the president of Mexico. Twenty one of the pieces that have won this award are located in the museum.

Tonalá has long been recognized as a center for ceramics in Mexico. The streets are filled with artisan workshops and sidewalks stalls selling pottery and stoneware pieces. One thing that distinguishes Tonalá made ware is the decorative details. Two elements, the nahual and the "flor de Tonalá" are common. A nahual is a pre-Hispanic shape shifter or shaman, often drawn as a smiling cat. The flor de Tonalá (Tonalá flower) first appeared in pottery design in the early 20th century. Its distinctive shape is an oval center with rounded petals that form a scalloped design. These elements can appear in all of the types of pottery that is produced here. Market days, Thursday and Sunday, are a good chance to see a wide variety of ceramics of the region, all spread out on the streets of the downtown. While there are a wide variety of figures, utensils and decorative items, it is not all that is produced. Many Many manufacturers sell their wares through other channels. To find the best pieces, one needs to visit the workshops and factories.

One noted potter from Tonalá is Jorge Wilmont. While his background is in the Tonalá tradition, he has been in the forefront of innovation of the craft. So many of his innovations have been adopted by so many potters in the area that just about anything that departs from tradition shows Wilmot's influence. Today, Wilmot lives in San Pablo del Monte in Tlaxcala, where he advises potters from there and the neighboring state of Puebla.

The municipality is home to the Museo Nacional de la Cerámica (National Ceramic Museum), which director Prudencio Guzman Rodriguez considers to be a "link between Tonalá's tradition and people interested in researching our tradition". Established in 1986, the museum has a collection of 1000 pieces that range from pre-Hispanic artifacts to contemporary prizewinners. The institution was begun when a board of local artisans and businessmen with sculptors Jorge Wilmot and Ken Edwards to find a way to promote the ceramic tradition here. Many of the artifacts are on loan from the Instituto Nacional Indigenista (National Indigenous Institute), and a number were donated by Wilmot. The rest of the pieces are prizewinners from the Certamen Estatal de la Cerámica (State Ceramic Contest). Unfortunately by the mid-1990s, the museum has to close due to lack of funds and maintenance. The municipality stepped in and the museum was reopened in 1996. The collection contains pieces created by some of the most renowned artisans of the area and are of the styles most typical to Tonalá such as bruñido, bandera, petatillo and canelo. Artists and artisans represented include Salvador Vásquez, Juan Antonio Mateo, Gerónimo Ramos, Nicasio Pajarito, Candelario Medrano, Jorge Wilmot and Ken Edwards.

Another popular liquid container in the Tonala area is the tinaja, a squat jug with a handle at the top and a small spout. In Santa Cruz de la Huerta, near Tonala, specializes in clay drainpipes, some crudely fashioned toys and whistles in the shape of animals. Most of these products are sold in public markets. One exception to this is the work of Candelario Medrano, who makes curious, sometimes grotesque sculptures. In his workshop can be found double decked boats, church buildings with miniature people, and animals such as lions, roosters and owls with savage human faces. They tend to be large pieces, made partly by mold and partly by hand, then painted in bright, clashing acrylics.

=== Guanajuato ===
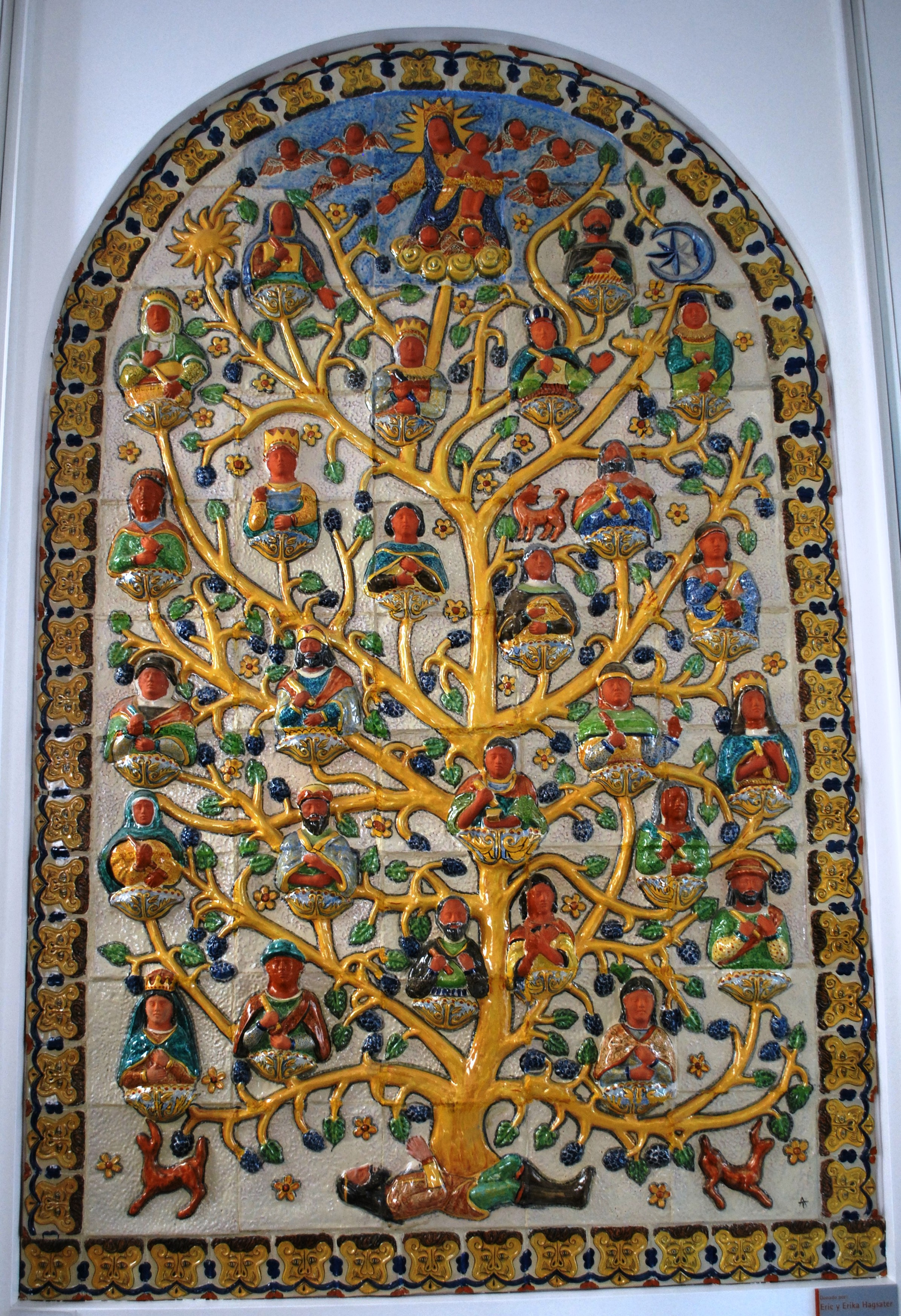
Mural done with Mayolica tiles entitled Arbol genealógico del comienzo del mestizaje (Genealogy tree of the beginning of the mestizo) by Gorky Gonzales Quiñones at the Museum of Artes Populares in Mexico City

Shortly after the Conquest, European style pottery came to dominate the area now known as the state of Guanajuato. During the colonial period, the city of Guanajuato had a strong Majolica tradition along with Puebla, which is being revived. These pieces are made with a tortilla mold for irregular shapes or by wheel. It is given an underglaze, usually a light cream color, fired, then painted with a design, glazed and fired again. Many of the motifs are made with colors such as yellow, blue-green, rust and blue. Principle makers in Guanajuato city are Gorky Gonzalez, who maintains traditional designs, and the Alfarería Capelo Mayolica, which produces large pieces with more intense and darker colors. In Santa Rosa de Lima, a group of former students of Capelo also make majolica.

A major producer outside of the capital is Alfarería Aguilera Mayolica Santa Rosa in Mineral de Santa Rosa, near Dolores Hidalgo. The designs of this workshop show indigenous influences, as well as some Italian and Chinese. Alfarería Aguilera is a family operation, run by several generations of the Aguilera family. Smaller workshops in this town produce both traditional and innovative designs for tableware, flower vases, and tile. One notable workshop is that of Juan Guerrero, who makes tableware with dramatic flowers of orange, yellow, and blue. Juan's father, Fortino, makes pottery with a plain reddish base and decorated with two tones of green glaze allowed to dribble down the sides. Some containers, such as flowerpots will have salamanders on the side. The making of majolica was introduced to Dolores Hidalgo by Father Miguel Hidalgo himself.

In addition to majolica, two large factories turn out hand painted ceramics of the kaolin type. These are Bram and Dosa in the city a Guanajuato and the town of Marfil respectively. Most of these designs are contemporary forms, with pastel floral motifs in a brilliant or matte finish.

In San Miguel Allende, a kind of primitive folk pottery is sold in the town market. They are sauce dishes and bowls of a red tone with whimsical distorted animal figures in black (from copper oxide) under a poor clear glaze. These actually come from a small village outside of San Miguel. A similar design is found in Coroneo, with the main difference being that the animal design is raised off the bottom of the vessel, which is produced by the mold. The raised design is painted black. While the features of the animals are not distorted, they are often given supernatural aspects, such as lions breathing fire.

=== Puebla ===
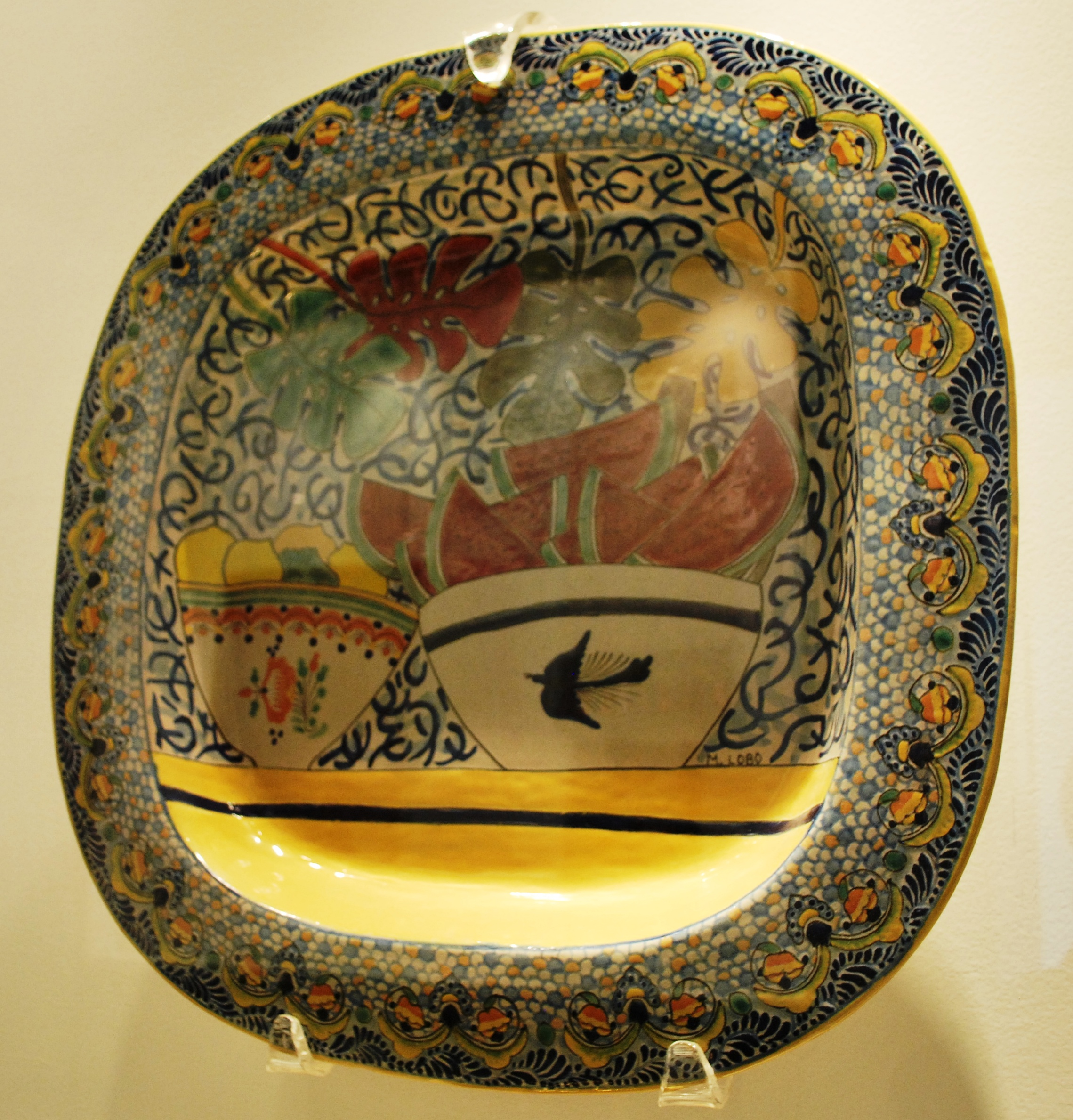
Talavera serving tray

Talavera pottery of Puebla, Mexico is a type of majolica ceramic, which is distinguished by a milky-white glaze. Authentic Talavera pottery only comes from the city of Puebla and the nearby communities of Atlixco, Cholula, and Tecali, because of the quality of the natural clay found there and a tradition of production that dates to the 16th century.

Ceramic tiles, jars and dishes can be found for sale all over the city of Puebla, and most of the historic center's colonial buildings are decorated with them. The process is slow and many pieces break during the process. Much of the ceramic is a bright blue on a white background, but other colors such as yellow, orange, green and purple can be used. The colors and designs reflected a mixed history with European, indigenous, Arab and Chinese influences. The craft arrived to the city soon after it was founded in the 1530s, when potters from Spain, including Talavera de la Reina established workshops. Production of this ceramic became highly developed in Puebla because of the availability of fine clays and the demand for tiles from the newly established churches and monasteries in the area. The industry had grown sufficiently that by the mid-17th century, standards and guilds had been established that further improved the quality, leading Puebla into what is called the "golden age" of Talavera pottery (from 1650 to 1750). Formally, the tradition that developed there is called Talavera Poblana to distinguish it from the similarly named Talavera pottery of Spain. It is a mixture of Chinese, Italian, Spanish and indigenous ceramic techniques. The production of tiles became very pronounced here as well, covering mostly prosperous churches and monasteries first and later over private homes, again to show socioeconomic status.

Talavera Santa Catarina is one of the few state certified Talavera producers in Puebla. The exclusivity of the genuine article is behind much of this ceramic's success. The name "Talavera" for pottery is legally restricted to wares made in Puebla and a couple of other nearby locations. Many imitations are made in Puebla and other places but only eight workshops have state authorization to use the Talavera name. There is a definite market for those willing to pay a premium for made-to-order pieces with authentication certificates. Most is sold overseas because the pieces fetch a much higher price. Clients can come simply to order an entire set of dishes or tiles to put on buildings back to their home countries.

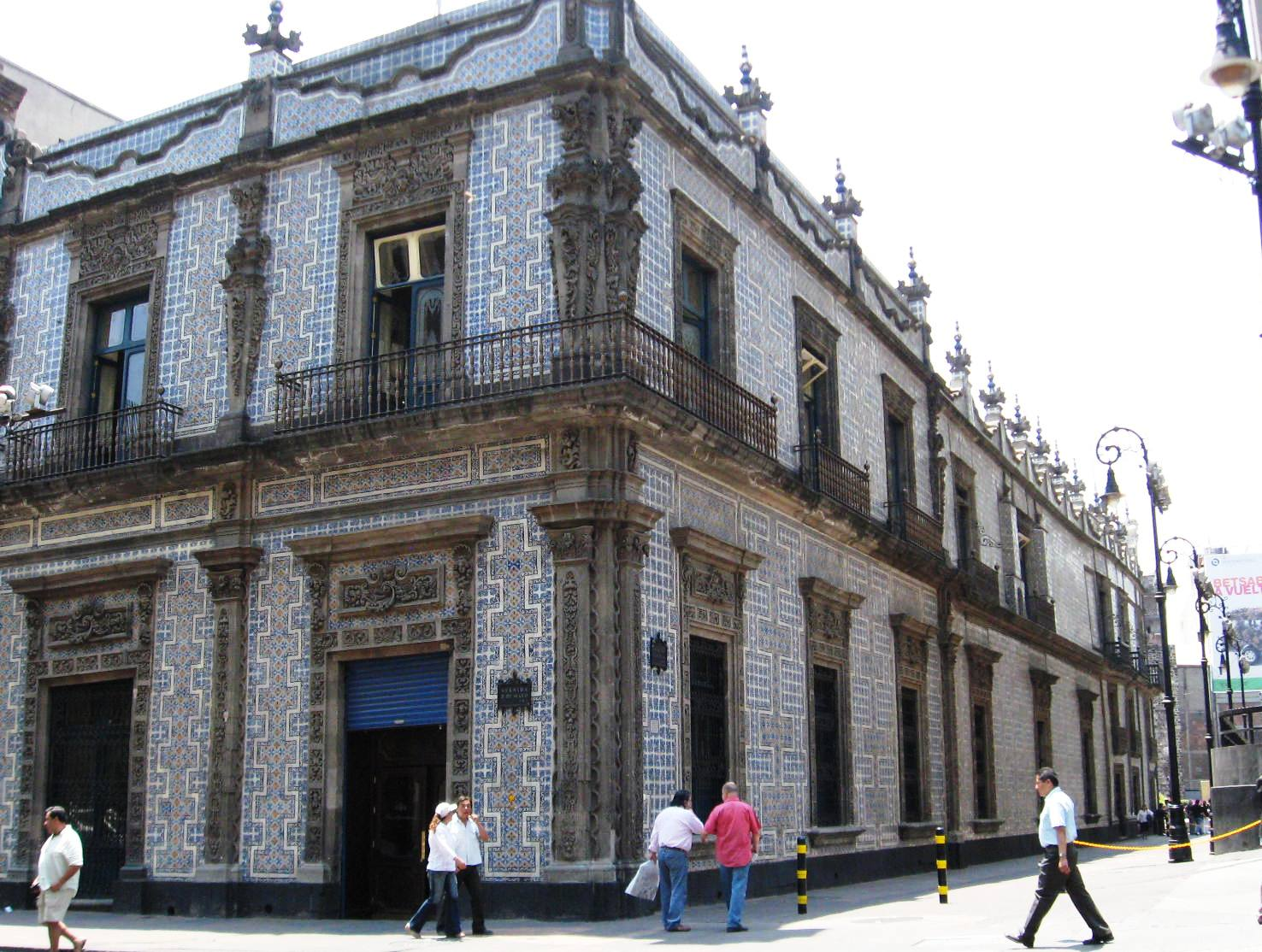
House covered in Puebla tile

A less expensive pottery made in Puebla is called Barrio de la Luz. Pieces of this type usually consist of cooking vessels, jars with lids, pitchers and others meant for ordinary kitchen use. It is yellow brown in tone with raised ornaments such as leaves or roses, which are usually given a transparent glaze while other parts receive a black glaze. In the northern part of Puebla state, most notably in the municipalities of Aquixtla and Chignahuapan, Nahuatl-speaking indigenous peoples produce cooking utensils such as comals, pitchers, pots and more with a glazed finish. They use a Moorish kiln, which conserves fuel and heat. The distinguishing feature of this pottery is that it has stamped designs, usually flowers. These stamps are cut clay tablets, which are impressed onto the pottery pieces. Izúcar de Matamoros specializes in "trees of life", sometimes called "candelabras". These are multibranched clay sculptures, which can have themes for different festivities such as Day of the Dead or Christmas. The branches are filled with flowers, leaves and imagery related to the theme. In addition, figures for Day of the Dead, such as skeletons, dressed as a charro or as an upper class lady (La Calavera Catrina). All of these decorative pieces are painted in bright colors. One exception to this is the works of Heriberto Castillo, who uses more subtle colors with a glazed finish. Alfonso Castillo distinguishes his pieces by using paints made with natural ingredients.

Another Puebla town that makes tree of life figures is Acatlán, located near the Oaxaca border. The branches often spring from the back of a bird or other animal. Other wares include realistic looking animals such as birds, iguanas or crabs with a place for a candle on their backs and flat-backed planters to hang on walls. These can be produced as either painted ware or as burnished ware, which is done in shades of red and black. One potter known for his burnished work is Herón Martinez.

=== Michoacán ===
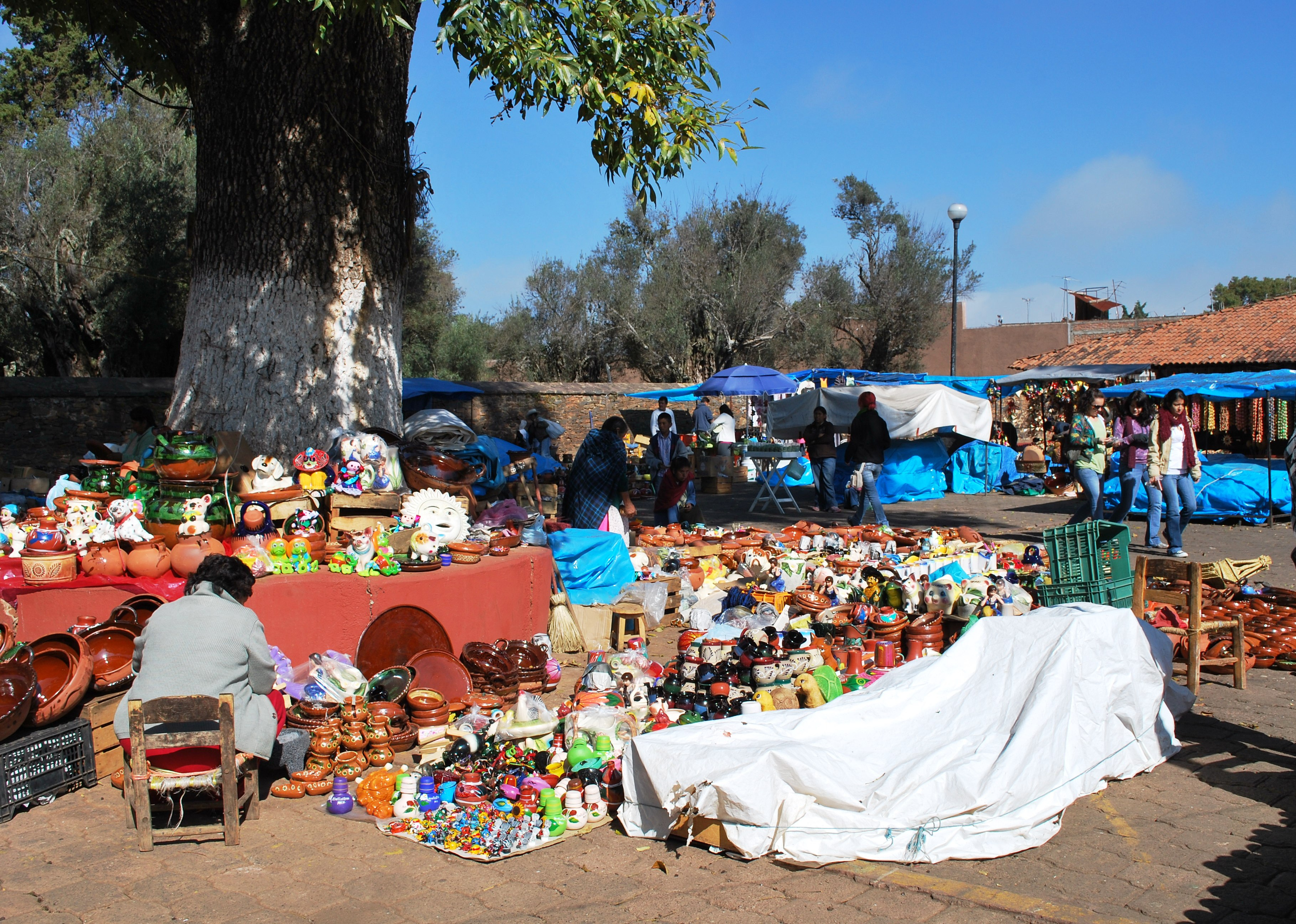
Pottery and other crafts for sale in Tzintzuntzan, Michoacán

Most of the pottery of note in the state of Michoacán comes from the Lake Pátzcuaro area. One town notable for its pottery is Tzintzuntzan, which produces a wide variety of pottery in home-based workshops. Most of these wares are sold to tourists. Much of the tableware produced is glazed. They are often decorated with the outlines of fish or water birds. Green glaze usually covers the interior and lip of the vessel, with the design painted on the uncolored clay outside, which is then covered in a transparent glaze. Black burnished pottery has also appeared there in the forms of flower vases and pitchers. Another typed of burnished potter is given a red slip before polishing and designed with simple motifs of birds and graceful curves of black and white. These usually take the shape of water jars with covers and handles as well as duck figures. Copies of pre-Hispanic wares, such as the tripod jar and doughnut-shaped water jugs, are also made. These are usually painted with geometric designs and fretwork.

In Santa Fe de la Laguna, a number of potters make glazed ware in popular shapes with black or green glaze covering most of the piece and the rest in average quality transparent glaze. Black glazed is generally used on large pieces such as water or fruit punch bowls with lids and decorated with raised leaves or roses. Many of these are made by Matias Jerónimo. Carmen Gaspar makes tableware with designs of animals or fish in white slip under green glaze. There has also been experimentation with new glaze colors, such as blue and mauve.

The town of Patambán in the southwest of the lake area makes a green glaze ware, which is distinguished by the quality of the glaze and the fine clay used. Even the bottoms of the pieces are glazed and have designs. Most of the forms are for common use such as little mugs, pitchers plates and platters. Designs vary from geometric or linear designs to free form animals such as rabbits. They are in white slip appearing as a sharp green. One form that is found both here and neighboring San José de Gracia is a water jar in the shape of a pineapple. The body is entirely covered in small conical lumps placed by hand. These jars range from one cup to five gallons in size. The lid is decorated with a representation of the spikey crown of the fruit. Most of these are also covered in Patambán's green glaze but a brown glaze version also exists. One other vessel this town makes along with Huantzio is a large-bellied water container with a small neck. These are not glazed in green but rather covered with a red slip and burnished. They are then decorated with black and white horizontal bands interspersed with rabbits, birds and flowers. Huanzito often uses a blue and green color scheme as well.

Quiroga sells big, black glazed pitchers and water jugs with relief scenes, mostly depicting the Danza de los Viejitos. The pottery is made in Santa Fe and painted in Quiroga. Ocumicho produces glazed figures of devils and other fantasies. The settings for the figures are whimsical, devils sitting on the edge of a volcano and a Noah's ark where the animals look extremely tired. Some of the best potters here are women. It is difficult to travel to the small village but the figures are sold in the towns of Uruapan and in the Casa de las Artesanias in Morelia.

Capula, a town near Morelia, produces a glazed ware that has become popular recently, and is now one of the most commonly found in popular arts stores in Mexico. It typically has a painted design of small, formalized flowers made up of round dot petals painted in white slip on the natural red of the clay, then fired with a clear glaze. The flowers may be limited to a band or applied lavishly over the entire piece. The latter is frequently done with casseroles and flower pots. Forms include dishes, casseroles and flower pots. More recently, potters from there have been experimenting with other designs, such as fish and birds made up of white or even colored dots such as blue, green or black. They are also modernizing their operation by introducing gas kilns and using a low-lead glaze.

=== State of Mexico ===
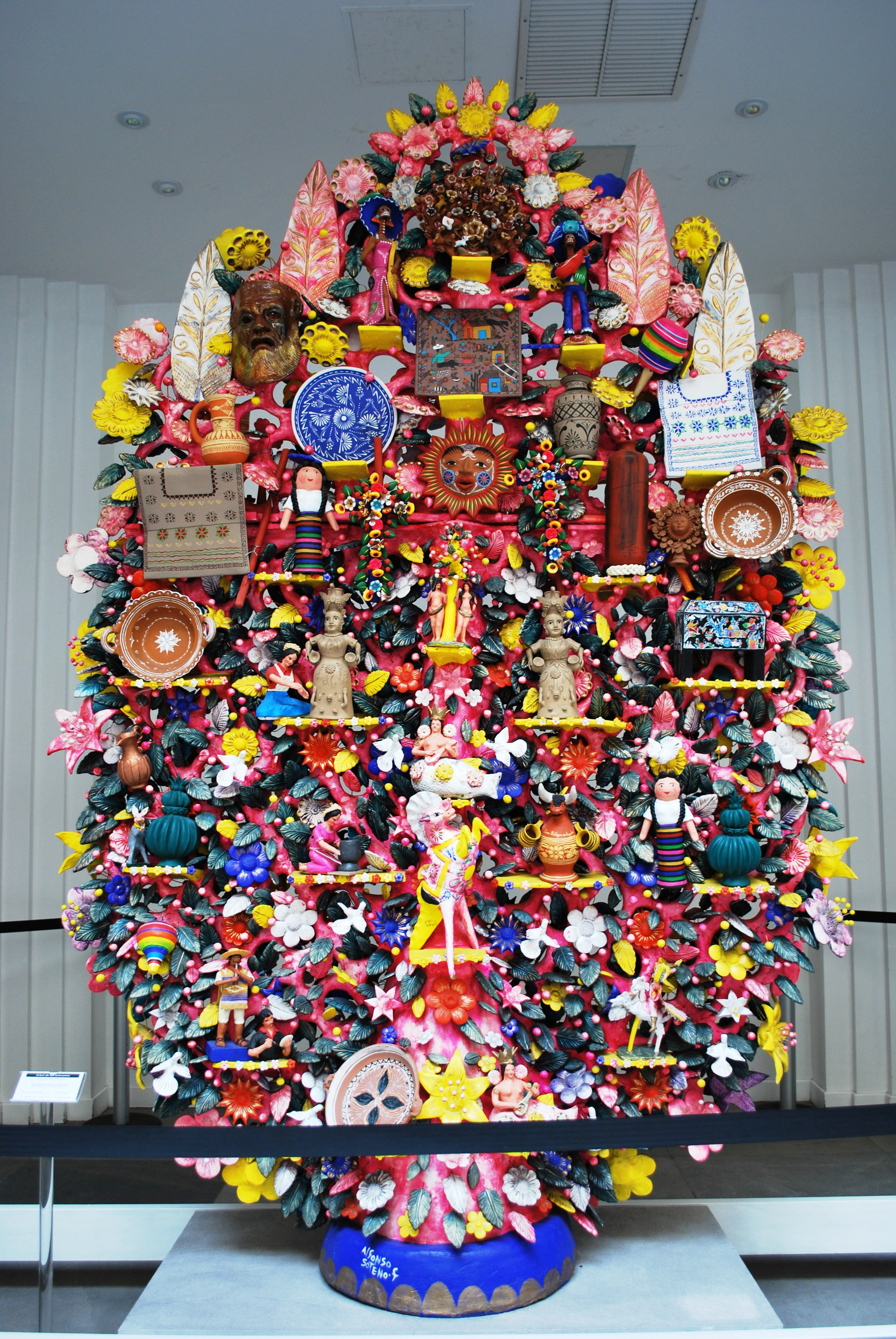
A Tree of Life sculpture by Oscar Soteno at the Museo de Arte Popular in Mexico City

The State of Mexico has several pottery towns with the best known being Metepec. The center of the town has a number of well-stocked crafts stores featuring local pottery as well as an outdoor market. The best known forms associated with Metepec are its Trees of Life, mermaids and animals such as lions, horses (with or without wings) and ox teams. That stands out about the forms is not so much their shape, which tends to be stocky and solid, but the colors that adorn them. Like alebrijes, they are painted in bright and quite unnatural colors such as pink, green, yellow and other colors. Some of the best known potters include José Vara, Saúl Ortega and Alfonso Soteno.

A "tree of life" (arbol de la vida) is a theme of clay sculpture created in central Mexico. The image depicted in these sculptures originally was for the teaching of the Biblical story of creation to natives in the early colonial period. The fashioning of the trees in a clay sculpture began in Izúcar de Matamoros, Puebla but today the craft is most closely identified with Metepec. Traditionally, these sculptures are supposed to consist of certain biblical images, such as Adam and Eve, but other themes such as Christmas, Day of the Dead and even themes unrelated to religion are made. Trees of life can be small or as tall as a person. The figures on the Trees of Life are made by molding and attached to the main tree figure with wires before firing. Most are painted in bright colors but there are versions painted entirely in white with gold touches and others left in their natural reddish clay color.

Another popular ware both to make and to adorn the houses are round suns with spiky halos with smiling or surprised faces. These are sold both painted and unpainted. The workshop of Saul Camacho makes majolica similar to the Talavera of Puebla and Manuel León Montes de Oca, makes copies of pre-Hispanic pieces. These pieces are valued because the artisan took the time to study the forms and cultures of the originals. Metepec also makes pottery for everyday use, generally of the natural clay color with simple geometric designs done in white slip. One of the more unusual pieces of this type are pitcher and cup set designed for the drinking of pulque. These often carry interesting slogans such as "I am yours" or "Long Live Pulque" or "Let him who drains me, fill me." They can also be distinguished by having animal or people heads (bull, goat, man with cigar and others) with the pulque coming out of the mouth. Many of these are made by Lázaro León. Another town that produced wares for pulque is Tecomatepec, near Ixtapan de la Sal. The pitchers are stately with scroll designs in black on a cream colored background finished in a transparent glaze. Other pieces include dishes, cups etc. also glazed in cream with raised swans or flowers and painted in yellow, green and blue. Copies of pre-Hispanic figures are made as well.

=== Chihuahua ===
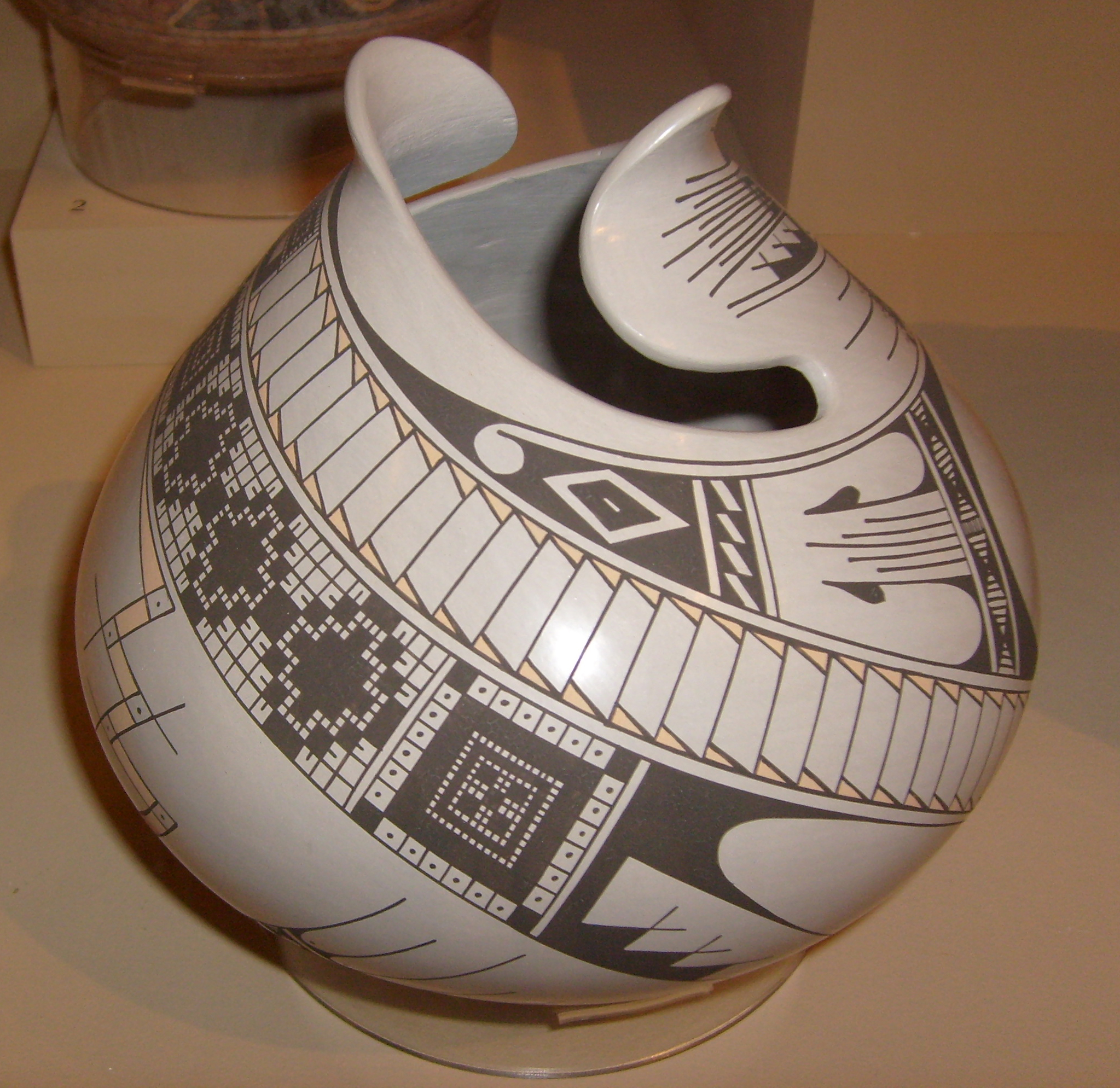
Example of Mata Ortiz or Pakimé pottery by Jorge Quintana

The village of Juan Mata Ortiz is located along the banks of the Palanganas River near Nuevo Casas Grandes in the high northern plains of Chihuahua. It was named after a 19th-century local hero who fought against the Apaches. It is the home of Juan Quezada, who is credited for creating Mata Ortiz or Pakimé style pottery. When he was fourteen, he came across the abandoned pre-Hispanic village of Pakimé along with fragments of its pottery. This pottery was decorated in intricate designs, and Quezada reasoned that materials for making it were nearby. The pottery he found is part of the Casas Grandes style polychrome pottery, which flourished between 1175 and 1400 and is related to Pueblo style pottery. Over time and with much experimentation, Quezada learned to recreate the pottery completely on his own with no prior training or experience at all.

Quezada gave his first pieces to family and friends, and then sold a few. Three of these early pieces made their way to a secondhand shop in Deming, New Mexico, where Spencer MacCallum, an archeologist and art historian found them. Realizing their value, MacCallum travelled to Chihuahua searching for the pots’ creator. Eventually, he made his way to the Mata Ortiz home of Juan Quezada. For eight years MacCallum provided financial support for Quezada to allow him to further develop the craft with MacCallum acting as mentor and agent. The pottery gained fame in art world, culminating in an exhibition at the Arizona State Museum in 1977. From then on, Quezada has taught his family and others in the community to make the pottery. Quezada does not keep his techniques nor his material supplies secret; rather he shares with any who have interest. Unlike a number of revivals of pottery traditions in Arizona and New Mexico, this renewal of an ancient art was done by one of the village residents without any help initially from archeologists or museums.

While Pakimé pottery is inspired by pre-Hispanic pottery, it is not an exact copy. Unlike other parts of Mexico, the pottery tradition broke completely here sometime during the colonial period. The current residents do not consider themselves to be the descendants of the Casas Grandes culture nor do their traditions tie to it. No one before Quezada's generation was involved with pottery. This has allowed the potters to experiment and test the limits of form and design, unlike many other Mexican potters who are constrained by generations of tradition. However, Quezada's recreation is interesting because he recreated two of the basic potting techniques from the pre-Hispanic period, the coil and molding methods. The raw clay is dug with a pick and shovel in the rugged foothills outside the town. It is cleaned by soaking it in water until it can be poured through a sieve. White clay is a favorite to work with but many colors are used. A potter's wheel is not used. The bottom of the pot is molded and the upper part is created by the coil method. When the pot is dry, it is rubbed with a stone or other hard object to make it shine. This can take days. Pots are fired on the open ground using wood and manure for fuel. Paints are made with mineral pigments collected locally. The pigments are ground into a powder using a metate grinding stone, then mixed with clay to make a milky fluid paint. Many use traditional colors such as red, white and earth tones, but brighter colors have also been used. Brushes are made from dog, cat and even human hair.

Over three hundred people in this village of about two thousand make these pots. Most artisans make low to medium quality wares, with only a few making fine pots that are thin and light. Highly regarded artists include the Quezada family, the Ortiz family, Taurina Baca, and Hector and Graciella Gallegos. Nicolas Ortiz is known for sculptural pieces. The pottery has been a great boon to the community economically. Before, men did seasonal labor and the women had no opportunity to earn money. The income from pottery has allowed families to build and improve homes and buy cars.

=== Other pottery traditions ===
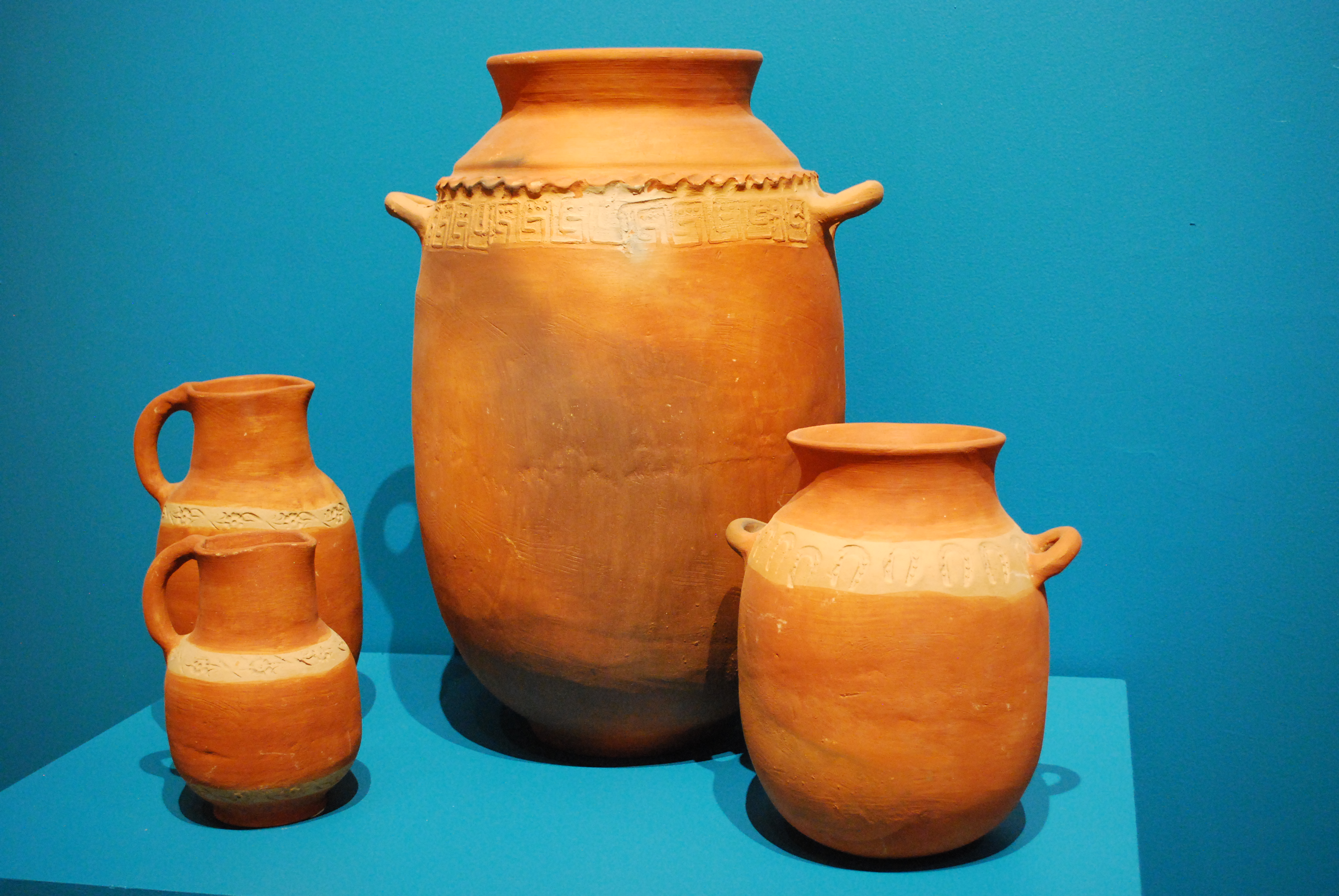
Ceramic storage jars by Ofelia Gonzalez Mendoza of Jose Maria Pino Suarez, Tepetitlan, Hidalgo as part of a temporary exhibit on Hidalgo crafts at the Museo de Arte Popular, Mexico City.

In Chililico, a Nahua village near Huejutla de Reyes, Hidalgo, women still dominate potting, producing decorated pieces for ceremonial use. They have also combined new ideas and techniques with traditional designs. One notable work is the faithful reproduction of rural scenes on their wares, extending this decoration to newer items such as ashtrays and pictures.

States along the Gulf coast, such as Veracruz, Tabasco, Campeche and Yucatán have centers associated with pottery but most of these produce to serve local needs and much of the work used to be done solely by women. Since pottery work has been done here for centuries has had less European influence on it than in the central highlands, indigenous influence can still be seen in many of the utensils and toys. With the introduction of firing kilns and glazing, men have become more involved in many areas, with many pottery production centers now family affairs. Major pottery centers in Veracruz are located in Blanca Espina, Aguasuelos and Tlacotalpan. In Blanca Espuma, most of what is produced in household ware with pieces glazed and decorated in ways similar to Aguasuelos and Chililico. In Aguasuelos, large pots called ollas are produced. Many of these are still decorated with flowers as in the past, but designs are shifting in favor of churches of the region, houses and even scenes of daily life.

Ceramic figure with remains of Maya blue, 600 to 900 AD, Jaina Island.

In Tlacotalpan, water coolers are principally produced, which are common in hot climates. So that the coolers fulfill their function, the clay is only smoothed and then burnished on some of its surfaces, giving it a decorative effect with contrasting textures. Water absorption by the walls of the clay receptacle keeps the water cool.

In Tepakan, Campeche, a Maya community, they make traditional flowerpots and whistles. They also make pitchers in dark brown tones that represent, according to the female potters, the wind god. One of the largest kilns of the Moorish type in Mexico is also found here. Close to Tepakan, in the neighboring state of Yucatán is the Maya village of Ticul. The specialty here is the reproduction of Maya pieces found in the tombs of Jaina, an island just offshore in the Gulf.

Amatenango del Valle, Chiapas is home to a ceramics production factory that is a significant source of employment for the local population. Objects produced include miniature animals, real and fantasy, modeled principally by children. The adults, mostly women, produce large objects such as large jars called tinajas. These are decorated using slips of various colors. Dove-shaped flowerpots are another common piece. Because these are large pieces, and because of tradition, the pieces are fired on the ground with the wood piled on top.

Pre-Columbian Mexico had a great tradition for thousands of years of making sculptures and figurines in clay, much of which was lost during the Spanish colonization of the Americas and Mexican Colonial period. The tradition began to make a comeback in the mid 20th century with artists such as Juan Soriano, Francisco Toledo and Mathias Goeritz. Many of these artists used clay to make rough drafts of works to be done in other materials such as metals, but eventually turned to clay as the primary medium. Clay sculpting came back to the forefront of Mexican art with an exhibition called "Terra incognita" at the Museo de Arte Moderno in 1981, although relatively little has been written about the phenomenon. Some of the best known current artists in this medium include Gerardo Azcunaga, Adriana Margain, Javier Marin and Miriam Medrez.

== Ceramics and the Mexican economy ==
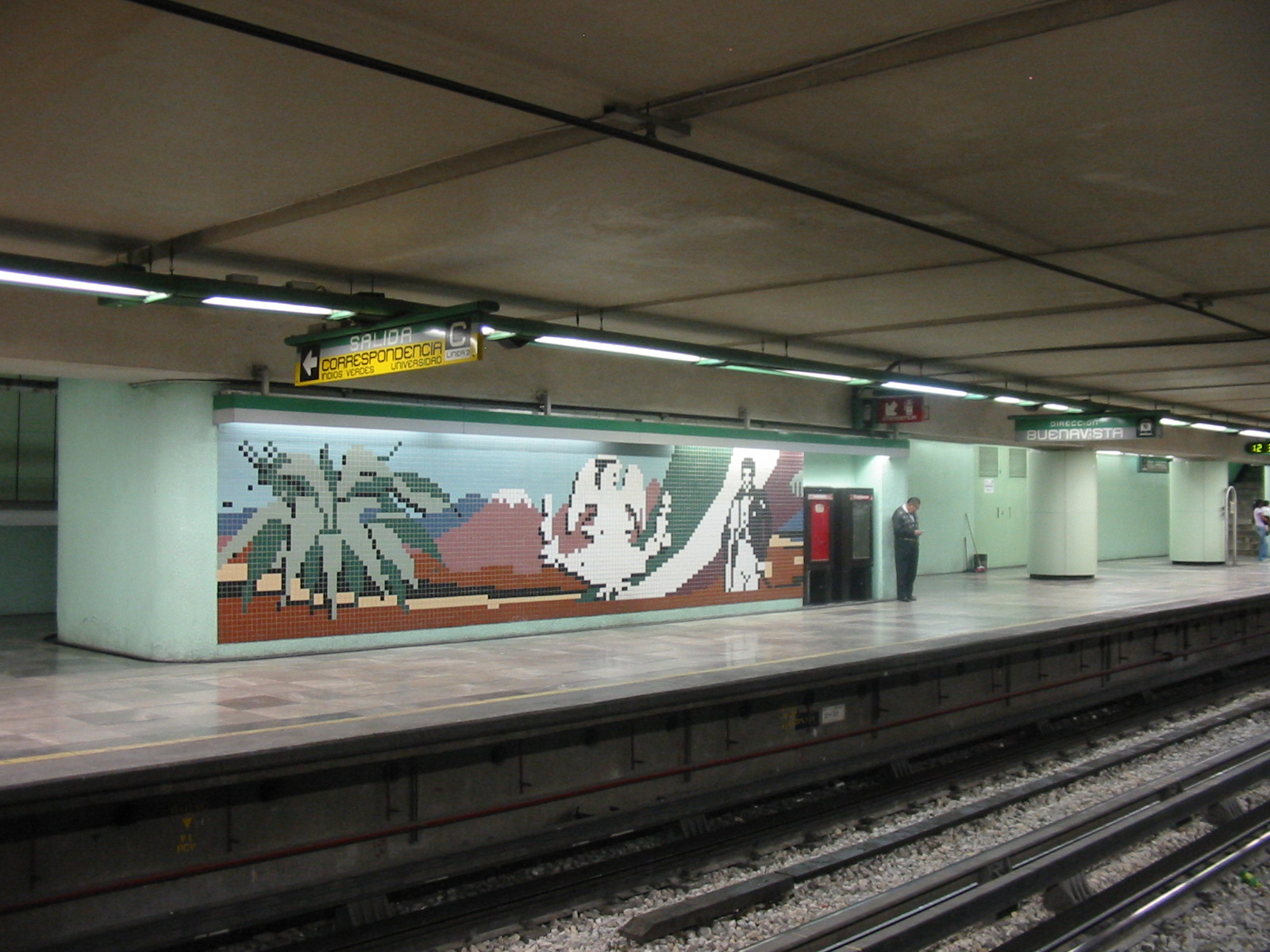
Tile mural in Metro Garibaldi in Mexico City

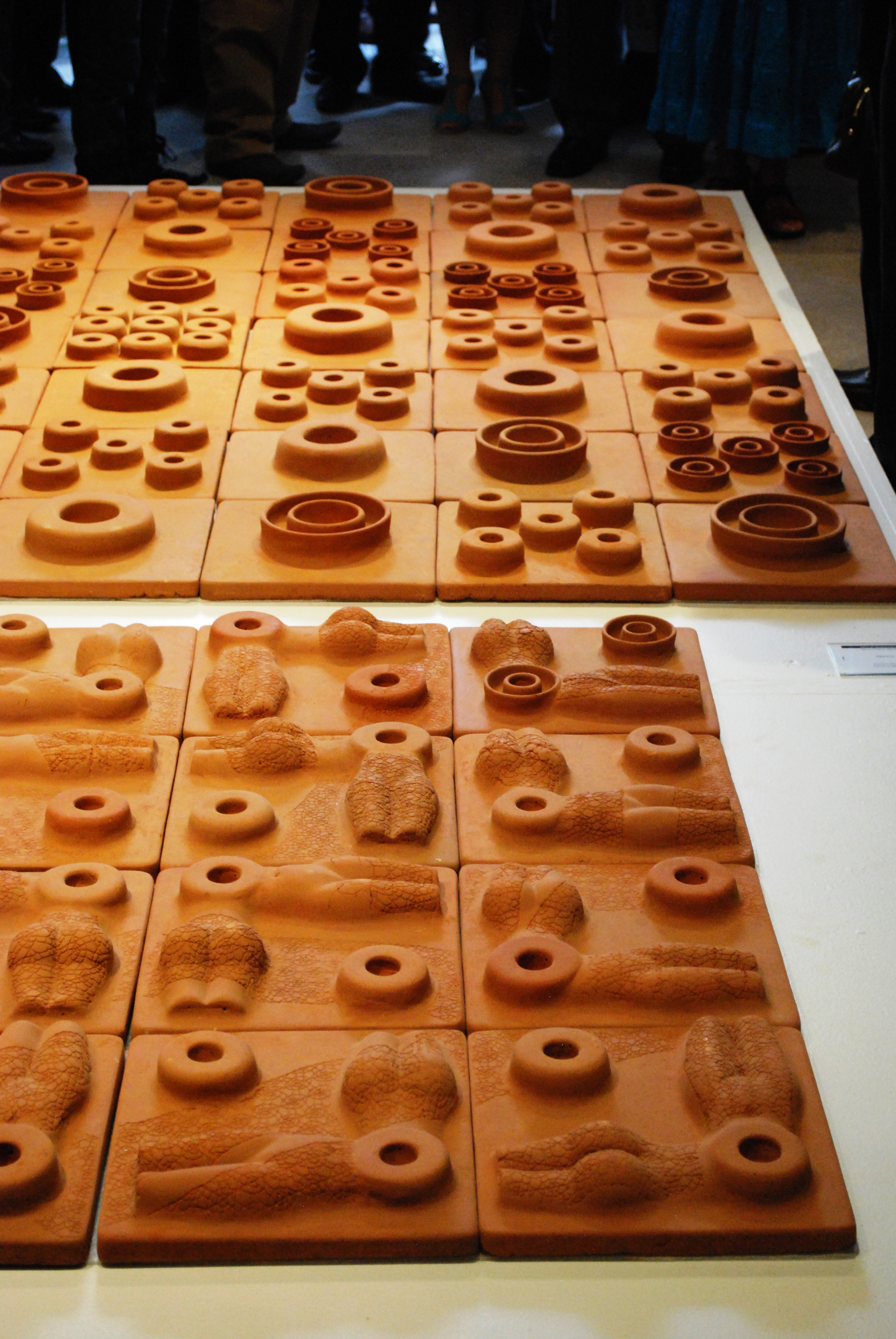
Tiles for wall murals created by Jesus Chavez Medina of Huasca de Ocampo.

While the production of pots and utensils is Mexico's signature pottery, ceramic floor and wall tiles consist of the bulk of Mexico's ceramic production. The second largest type of ceramic product is bathroom fixtures, such as toilets, washbasins and accessories. Most of the raw materials are obtained from the local market, with limited amounts of other raw materials being imported. Most of equipment used to mass-produce ceramics of this type comes from Italy, including pressure molds and development technology. However, companies are also considering US suppliers for mixers, conveyors, ovens and electronic control equipment due to the country's proximity and NAFTA tariffs.

In 1994, Mexico exported to the United States US$78.1 million of glazed and unglazed floor coverings, importing US$17 million in equipment and raw materials for these products. 75% of bathroom fixtures are exported to the United States to the a value US$54.7 million in 1994.

The most underdeveloped mass ceramics area is in tableware, porcelain and stoneware. Mexico has only two major tableware manufacturers, Anfora and Santa Anita, which produce porcelain and stoneware respectively. Anfora is the only one that has been successful in exporting its goods to US companies including Panera Bread, Pottery Barn and Starbucks. Most of these ceramics are imported from other countries such as the United States, Japan and Germany despite its ability to produce it itself. However, the lack of certain raw materials may partially explain this. Another problem is the continued production of lead glazed ware, which cannot be exported. While lead free and low lead glazes have been developed for use with low temperature firing, the most traditional, only about half of artisans use it.

However, the fastest growing ceramics industry sector is composed of small companies that manufacture mostly handmade tableware and decorative articles. This industry sector is rapidly finding export markets in the United States, the Far East, and in some parts of Europe. It is labor-intensive, but does require the importation of certain equipment such as kilns. Most of goods produced by this sector is exported to the United States. As this sector continues to grow and become more sophisticated, more manufacturing equipment will likely be imported.

For people living in very rural areas of Mexico with little to no employment, the production of crafts, especially ceramics, provide an option. For many people living in rural Oaxaca economic options are limited to subsistence farming, working in Mexico City or illegally migrating to the United States. This has left many small villages such as San Jeronimo Slayopylla virtual ghost towns, populated only by some elderly, women and children. For at least some, the interest in native and folk pottery provides another option. Cooperatives, such as "Polvo de Agua" unite craftspeople from various locales to sell their wares and provide income for their families. The production of pottery has raised living standards in other small villages in other areas, such as Mata Ortiz in Chihuahua as well. Most artisans in rural areas learn the trade from their families and continue in the same techniques their ancestors used. For many in rural areas, the selling of pottery is their only cash income.

A growing number of potters are also turning to the Internet to sell their items abroad, even if they do not have direct access to a computer. Oscar Soteno, a renowned potter in Metepec, uses it to sell his trees of life sculptures and other works to the United States. Selling to the lucrative Christmas market is particularly profitable. Even though Day of the Dead motifs are not related to Halloween, they have found their way into many U.S. homes for this holiday, thanks to the Internet. Many artisans work with NOVICA.com, a company what works with third-world artists to help them sell their wares in other countries. This permits many artisans to sell directly, cutting out middlemen. Barro sin Plomo, an organization related to the World Bank, has had success in exporting lead-free pottery items to the United States and says that the market outlook for these products is optimistic. One market segment is that of Mexican restaurants in the U.S. who want to have Mexican style dishes but cannot import enough that meet U.S. lead standards. Another possible market is Central America.

State and federal government agencies have been created to support ceramic production, especially in the rural areas. The Premio Nacional de Cerámica was begun in 1977, and awards cash prizes in various category. The most prestigious prize is the Galardon Presidencial (Presidential Recognition), which is signed by the president of Mexico. Each year, Metepec hosts the Concurso Nacional de Alfarería and Ceramica "Arbol de la Vida." This event awards a first prize of 50,000 pesos to the best work done in clay. There are also prizes for subcategories such as glazed and unglazed pieces as well as high-fire and low-fire ceramics. The event attracts artist and artisans from Oaxaca and Jalisco as well as the State of Mexico. Judges come from the Museo de Arte Popular in Mexico City, UAEM and other institutions.

Despite the support and interest in traditional Mexican ceramics, the number of artisans is dropping. In 1994, there were just over 1.5 million ceramic artisans in the country, which dropped to 50,000 by 2006. This made craftsmen almost non-existent in some states. Majolica is no longer being produced in Aguascalientes and the number of workshops in Guanajuato state has been cut in half in recent years. In major cities such as Mexico City and Monterrey, there is only a handful. One reason for this is that many craft products are being replaced by cheaper pewter and plastic wares. Another reason is that many from craft producing areas have left to work in the United States.

== See ==
- Pre-Columbian era
  - Category: Pre-Columbian pottery
  - Category: Mesoamerican art
- Native American pottery
- Category: Mexican potters
- Pretty Ladies (female figurines)
