= Oaxacan =

Oaxacan refers to something from Oaxaca, Mexico

It may also refer to:

- Oaxacan cuisine
- Oaxacan yellow tree frog
- Oaxacan pygmy rattlesnake
- Oaxacan cat-eyed snake
- Oaxacan oak anole
- Blanco family (Oaxacan potters)
- Oaxacan leaf-toed gecko
- Oaxacan wedding
- Oaxacan woodcarving
- Oaxacan montane forests
- Oaxacan Dwarf Boa
- Oaxacan false brook salamander
- Oaxacan arboreal alligator lizard
- Oaxacan pocket gopher
- Oaxacan Chontal
- Oaxacan spiny-tailed iguana
- Oaxacan coral snake
- Oaxacan patchnose snake
- Oaxacan Mixean
- Oaxacan climbing salamander
- Friends of Oaxacan Folk Art
- Oaxacan caecilian
- Oaxacan cat-eyed snake
