= Blanco family (Oaxacan potters) =

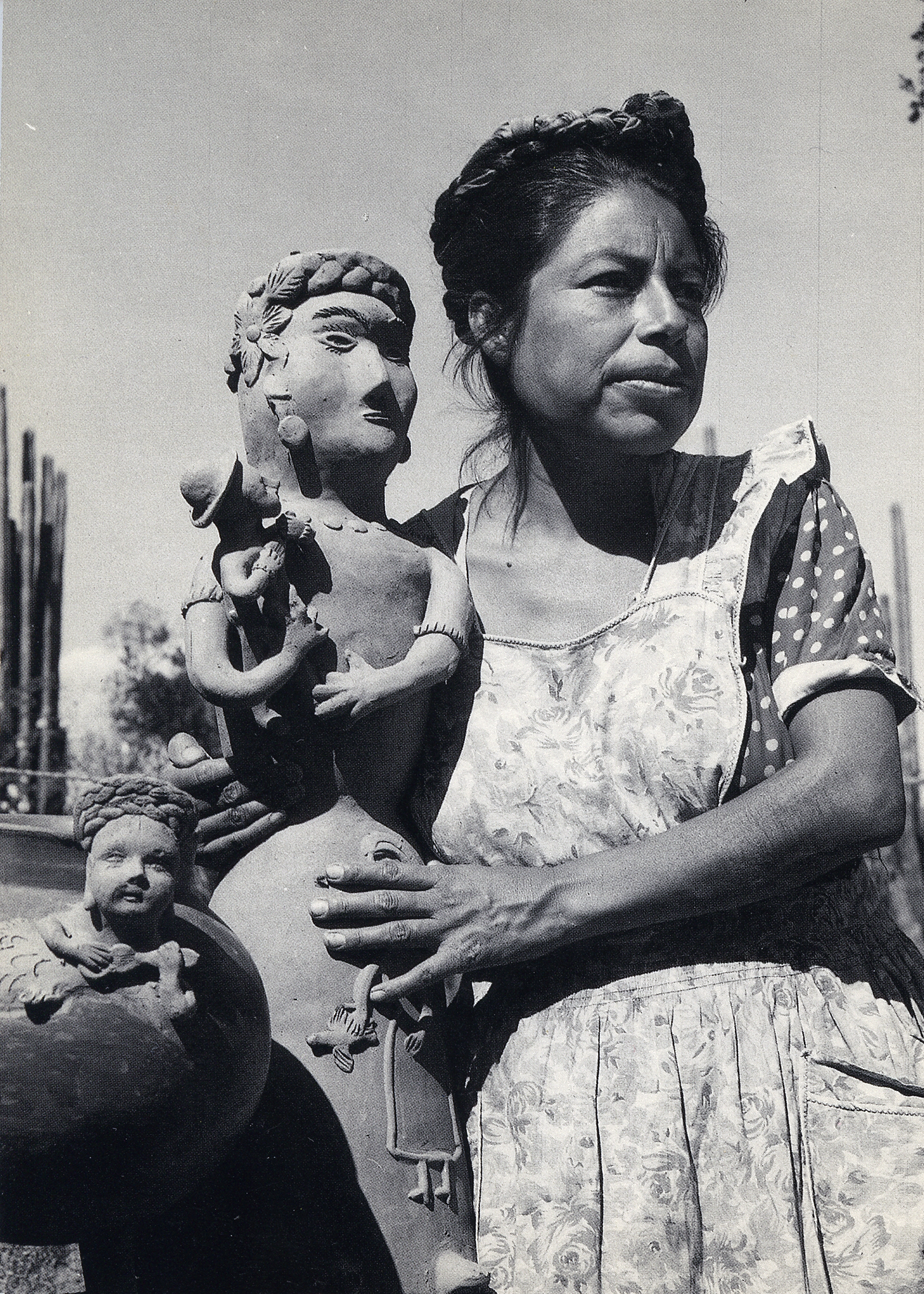
Matriarch Teodora Blanco Nuñez with piece

The Blanco family of Santa María Atzompa, Oaxaca, Mexico is noted for their ceramic production, especially decorative pieces. Their fame began with Teodora Blanco, who as a young child added decorative elements to the more utilitarian wares made by her parents. Eventually her work became noted by a foreigner who not only bought her entire production, also encouraged her to create new forms, leading to mostly human figures called “muñecas” (lit. dolls). Her form of decoration, called “pastillaje,” was also an innovation for the area’s pottery and consists of small pieces of clay added onto the main surfaces, often covering much of the area. Teodora taught her children and although she intended that only the oldest daughter carry on her work, today three generations of the family continues making mostly decorative pottery, mostly following her work. These include Irma García Blanco, who have been recognized by the Fomento Cultural Banamex and Fernando Félix Pegüero García, who has won prizes from the Friends of Oaxacan Folk Art in New York and Premio Nacional de Cerámica in Tlaquepaque, Jalisco.

== Teodora Blanco ==
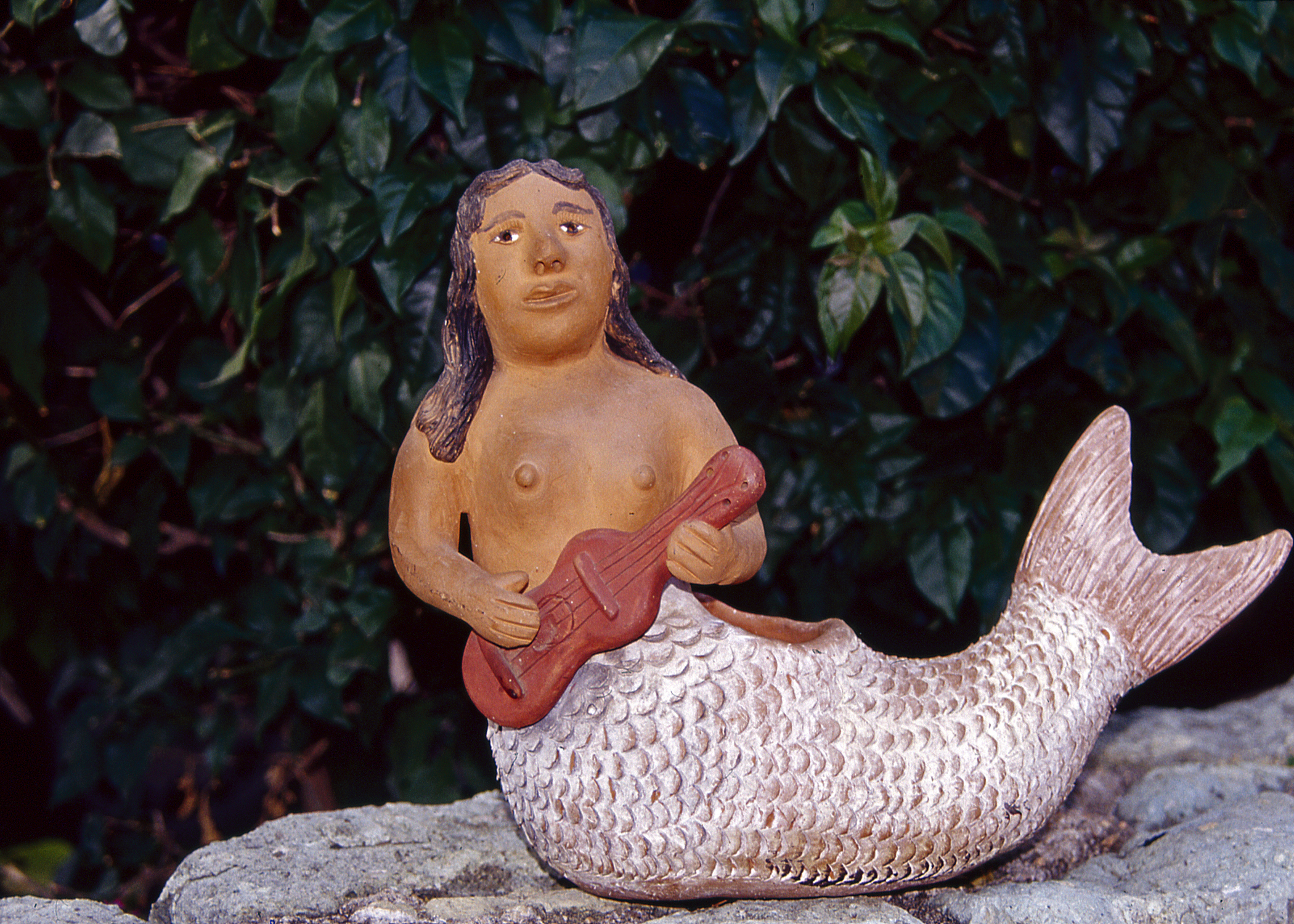
Mermaid figure by Isaura Alcántara

Teodora Blanco was born in Santa María de Atzompa, a town were pottery-making is dominated by women. Her parents where potters, mostly making ashtrays, figures of monkeys called machines and small figures of musicians. She began working with clay when she was about six years old and soon her work stood out for the addition of decorative elements on her ashtrays.

Since she was young, Teodora sold her wares at the 20 de Noviembre market in the city of Oaxaca. In the 1970s, a foreigner in the market was attracted to her work and offered to buy all of her production. Shortly after, he requested more variety in her work, which led her to create the female figures she called “monas.” The first ones were simple, usually images of a woman with an infant or even a tourist. Over time the figures became more varied and more complicated. She eventually worked with various government agencies as well as the Rockefeller Foundation.

Teodora invented the “muñecas” (lit. dolls) on which many variations have been developed. Teodora’s most characteristic pieces are large-scale, fantasy creatures, generally human with animal head or horns. Sometimes they are women doing common activities such as nursing children. They are further characterized by a type of decoration she called “pastilaje,” superimposed small pieces of clay on the main surfaces. All of her work was created with rudimentary tools, such as a “wheel” consisting of nothing more than an inverted bowl with a plate or comal on top.

Teodora’s work made her notable by breaking away from the local pottery tradition but also enhancing it. She was invited to events such as World Crafts Council meetings in and out of Mexico and won many national and international prizes and other recognitions. Two years before her death, Nelson Rockefeller came to Oaxaca to meet her, who collected over 175 pieces of her work. Her ceramics also made her relatively wealthy by rural Oaxaca standards. However, she remained a “campesino” with this wealth mostly shown in the way of the purchase of farm animals.

As per tradition in Santa María Atzompa, Teodora charged her oldest daughter with carrying on her pottery. However, she also taught her other daughter and three sons. One of these sons became a noted potter as well. The creation of muñecas and use of pastillaje have become tradition in the Blanco family, especially in the work of her brother, her two daughters and one son, as well as a number of her grandchildren.

Teodora died on December 23, 1980, at age 52.

== Luis García Blanco ==
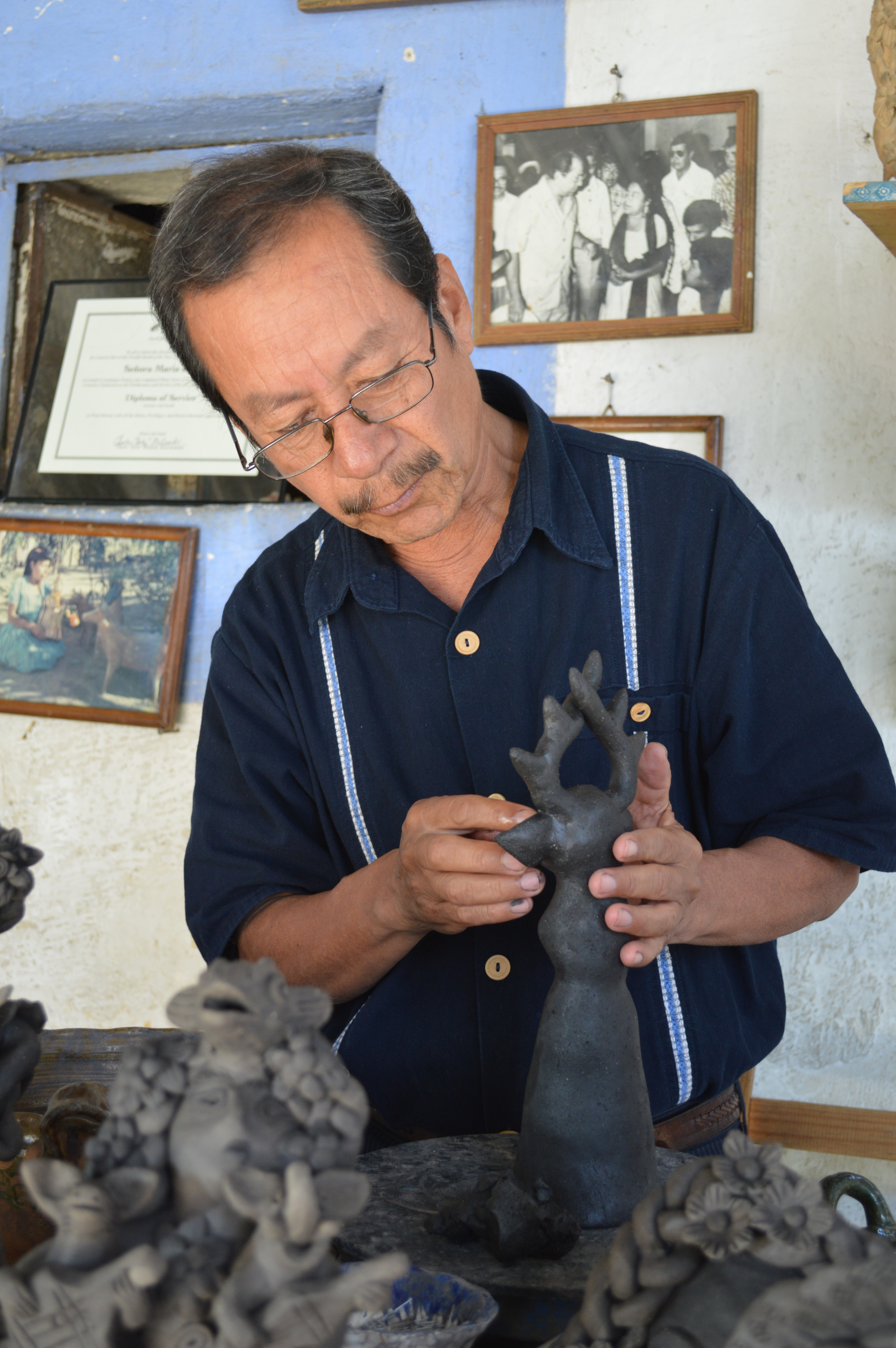
Luis García Blanco in the family workshop in Santa María Atzompa

Teodora's oldest son Luis continues his mother's tradition, having been taught by her, making figures since he was six years old. Today, he works with his wife María Rojas de García, who was also taught by Teodora. He remains faithful to much of what his mother taught him, especially in pastillaje work, but he does have his own style, especially in the creation of human faces. He makes both animal and human figures as well as fantasy figures which combine elements from humans and animals, such as mermaids and persons with animal heads. One other speciality is nativity scenes. Luis also still lives in the family compound where his mother lived and worked but in a house he built for his family. Luis has exhibited his work in Mexico, the United States (San Antonio, Santa Fe and Tucson) and Europe. Luis and María's children have also worked with their parents and Luis is concerned about preserving the tradition.

== Irma García Blanco ==
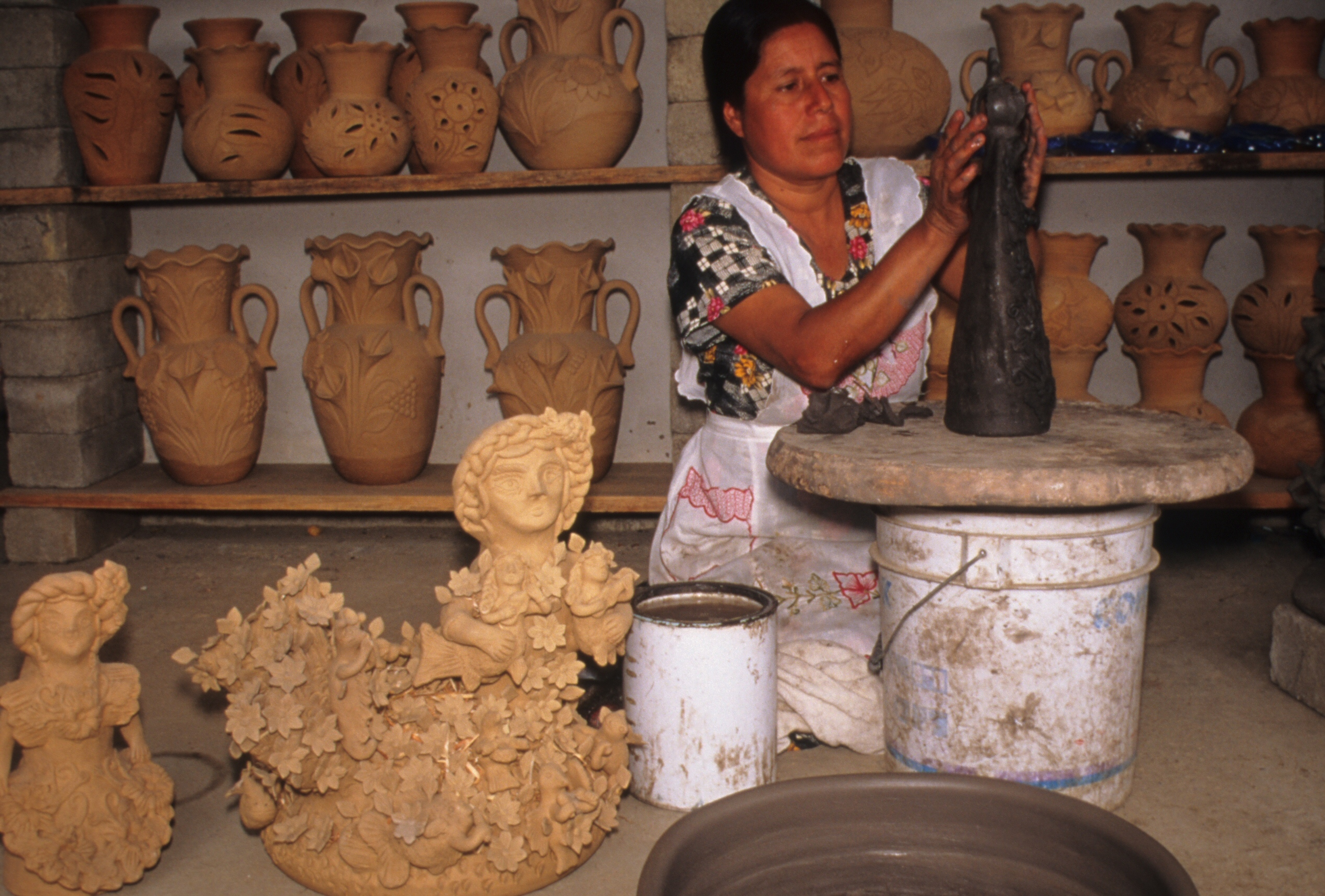
Irma Garcia Blanco in her workshop

Irma García Blanco is one of Teodora’s daughters, born in Santa María Atzompa in 1959. Irma continues her mother’s legacy with her own large, ornate clay figures which are lively and full of detail. Irma began working with clay at the age of six, helping her mother by making small figures. Although Irma herself only finished the second grade, some of her seven children have gone onto college. Irma’s husband worked in Mexico City as a factory sales person for 27 years, commuting home on the weekends. He retired when the factory closed. Since then, Irma’s work has become the main family income and has received support from her husband.

Irma is best known for continuing the creation of ornate “muñecas” started by her mother. These works are lavishly ornate, with the female figures with proportionally short torsos, sometimes having an overabundance of decorative details. They include mermaids and women selling in the market. Some of the figures are surrounded by small animals such as dogs and rabbits, others are covered in flowers. Irma also creates altars with crucifixes, angels, Virgin Mary figures bearing angels, nativity scenes and mermaids. Two other notable themes are fountains and reproduction of the Moctezuma cypress at Santa María del Tule, which are decorated with elements from the seven regions of Oaxaca. She says she is not bored with repetition of themes as she does them each time a little differently, because the decorative details are all done by hand.

Her technique is also similar to her mothers, using simple tools including the bowl and plate “wheel” as well as clay mined locally. Some of the basic shapes are created with molds but generally are modified by hand and the decorative details are also done by hand. She prefers to make pieces of natural clay color, so most of her pieces are not painted. However, sometimes she does cover them in a slip as a protective coating.

Irma has also received numerous prizes and other recognitions for her work, including the Premio Fomento Cultural Banamex in 1996 and her work featured in the "Grandes Maestros del Arte Popular" and "Out of Volcanos" by Margaret Sayers Peden. Her work is also regularly exhibited such as a show sponsored by the Fomento Cultural Banamex in the city of Durango in 2012. Irma’s work is mostly sold to collectors and she feels it is important for people to see the creation process to truly appreciate the pieces.

She trains other artisans in her community, creating an informal school. She has worked with Isaiah Zagar, and some of her pieces are incorporated into and featured in the Philadelphia's Magic Gardens.

== Alicia Leticia García Blanco ==
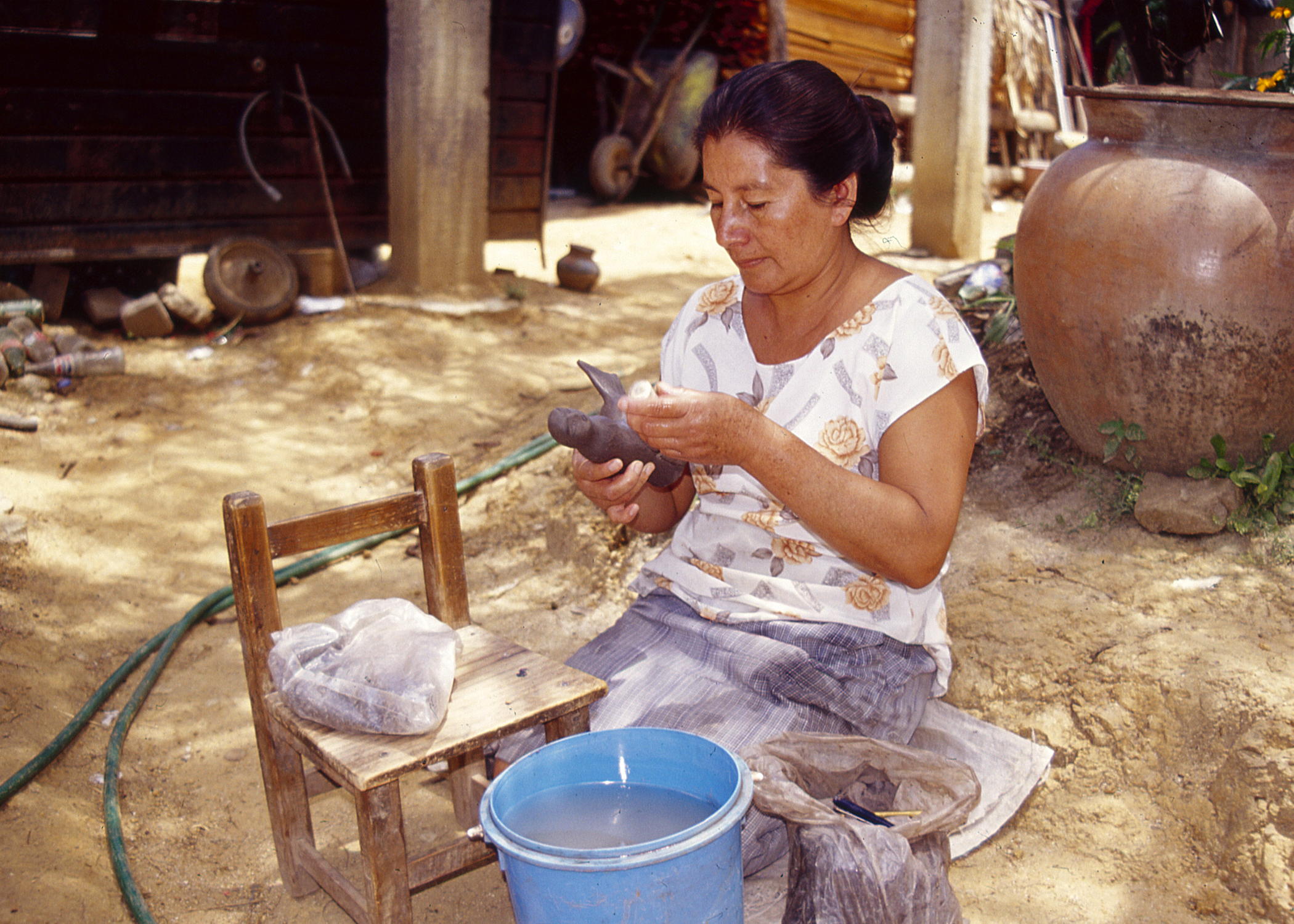
Letty in her workshop

Also known as Letty, Teodora's younger daughter specializes in small, imaginative pastillaje and engraved figures, especially mermaids. Other themes include women at the market, angels, humans on burros and nativity scenes. She began making pieces when she was nine or ten, becoming proficient with smaller pieces at age sixteen and larger pieces at age twenty. Today, Letty works with her two daughters, mostly by acquiring clay and selling their mother's work.

== Fernando Félix Pegüero García ==
Fernando Félix, born 1988 in Santa María Atzompa, is the son of Alicia Leticia and the grandson of Teodora. He began creating in clay when he was five, learning from his mother and has specialized in piece related to Day of the Dead.

The artisan has participated in major folk art events such as those in 2008 and 2009 at the Museo Estatal de Arte Popular Oaxaca (MEAPO). In 2010, his work won two awards. One was first place in the miniatures category at the Friends of Oaxaca Folk Art’s young artist competition for a work called “The Wedding of Catrina and the Cowboy.” This win allowed him to attend the Taller de Arte Plásticas Rufino Tamayo in the city of Oaxaca to study ceramics, sculpting and painting. The other recognition from the Premio Nacional de Cerámica in Tlaquepaque, Jalisco. He also won second place at the fifth State Nativity Contest in Oaxaca. Fernando has since enrolled as a fine arts major at the Universidad del Estado de Oaxaca.

== Other notable members of the family ==
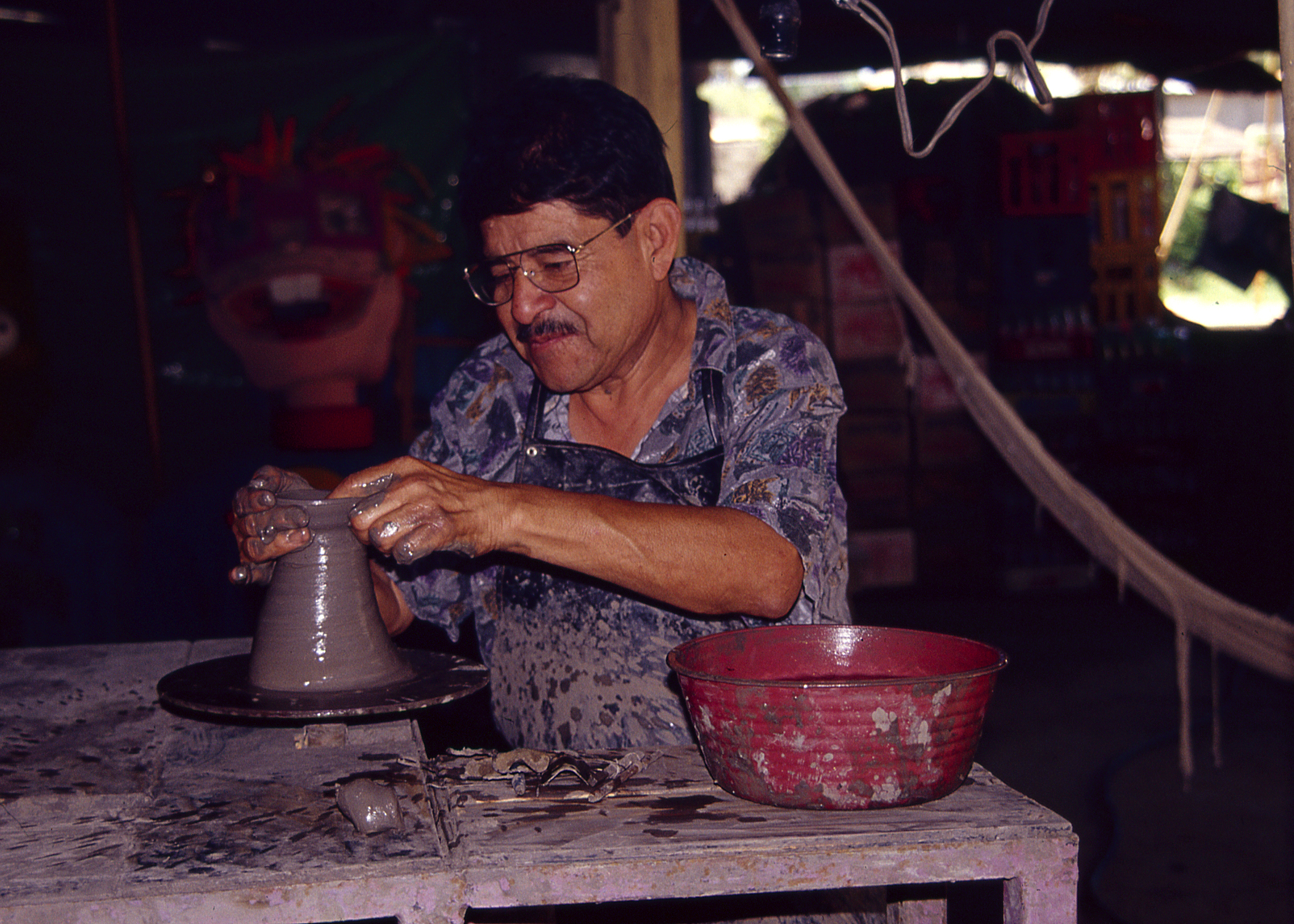
Avelino Blanco Nuñez

Several other members of the Blanco family have continued the tradition of decorative pottery, all still in the same town in Oaxaca. Faustina Avelino Blanco Núñez is the brother of Teodora. He works with his two daughters and son to produce terra cotta, green glaze and multi-color glazed pieces. These pieces range from the purely decorative such as miniatures of musician and human figures to utilitarian works including jugs, planters, plates, containers and cups. All pieces are decorated with the pastillaje technique. The miniature musicians are inspired by the author’s decades as a guitarist. Bertha Blanco Núñez is Teodora's sister but much younger. Was taught the basics by their parents and at one time Teodora signed Bertha's work as her own. By age ten, she began to create small female figures and by the time she was sixteen had moved on to creating large images of the Virgin Mary which are now her trademark. When she married at age 27, she moved away from the family compound and began to work completely on her own. She does the work on her pieces completely by herself.

== See also ==
- List of Mexican artisans
