= Barro negro pottery =

Style of pottery from Oaxaca, Mexico

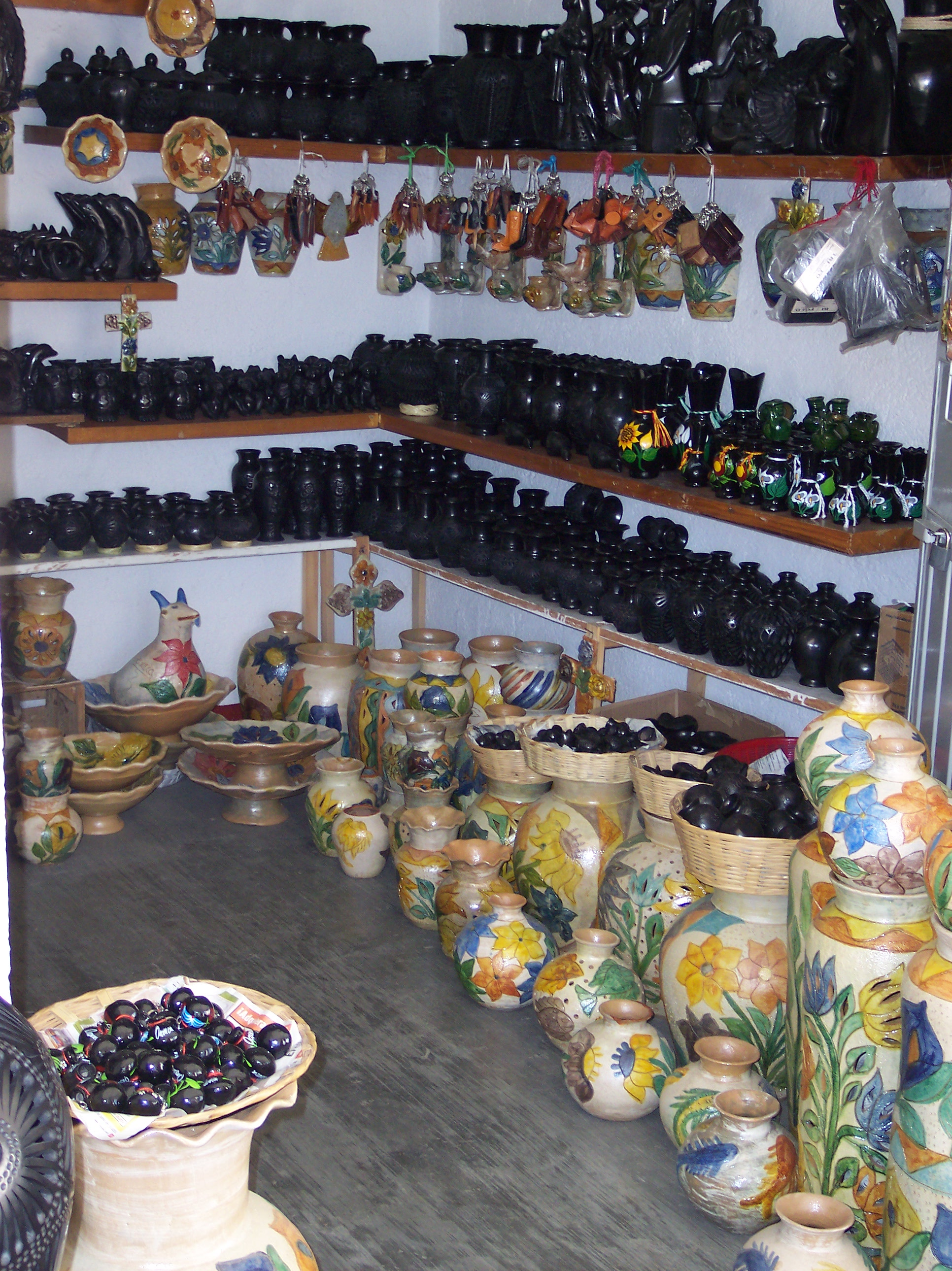
Store in San Bartolo Coyotepec with Barro Negro pottery

Barro negro pottery ("black clay") is a style of pottery from Oaxaca, Mexico, distinguished by its color, sheen and unique designs. Oaxaca is one of few Mexican states which is characterized by the continuance of its ancestral crafts, which are still used in everyday life. Barro negro is one of several pottery traditions in the state, which also include the glazed green pieces of Santa María Atzompa; however, barro negro is one of the best known and most identified with the state. It is also one of the most popular styles of pottery in Mexico. The origins of this pottery style extends as far back as the Monte Albán period. For almost all of this pottery's history, it had been available only in a grayish matte finish. In the 1950s, a potter named Doña Rosa devised a way to put a black metallic-like sheen onto the pottery by polishing it before firing. This look has increased the style's popularity. From the 1980s to the present, an artisan named Carlomagno Pedro Martínez has promoted items made this way with barro negro sculptures which have been exhibited in a number of countries.

== History ==
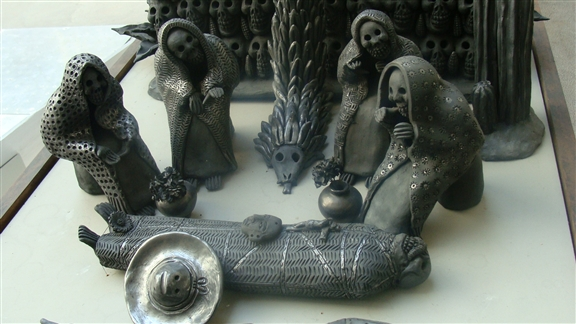
Sculpture of a funeral in barro negro at the Museo de Arte Popular, Mexico City.

Barro negro pottery can trace its origins to 2,500 years ago, with examples of it found at archeological sites, fashioned mostly into jars and other utilitarian items. It remains a traditional craft of the Zapotecs and Mixtecs of the Central Valleys area to this day. Originally, barro negro pottery was matte and grayish. In this form, the pottery is very sturdy, allowing it to be hit without breaking.

In the 1950s, Doña Rosa Real discovered that she could change the color and shine of the pieces by polishing the clay pieces and firing them at a slightly lower temperature. Just before the formed clay piece is completely dry, it is polished with a quartz stone to compress the surface. After firing, the piece emerges a shiny black instead of a dull gray. This innovation makes the pieces more breakable, but it has made the pottery far more popular with Mexican folk art collectors, including Nelson Rockefeller, who promoted it in the United States. This relatively recent popularity stems from the look, rather than durability, so many pieces are produced now for decorative purposes rather than utility. Doña Rosa died in 1980, but the tradition of making the pottery is carried on by her daughter and grandchildren who demonstrate the technique for tourists in their local potters' workshop. The workshop is still in the family home, where shelves of shiny black pieces for sale line the inner courtyard.

Another important person in the development and promotion of barro negro is Carlomagno Pedro Martinez. He was born in San Bartolo Coyotepec into a pottery-making family. From a young age, he showed talent in fashioning figures in clay. When he was grown, he attended the Fine Arts Workshop of Rufino Tamayo in Oaxaca city. He became the first potter and sculptor in the medium, winning his first recognition in 1985 for his work. His work depicting human skulls in the barro negro style increased his popularity. Each piece Carlomagno makes is unique, following themes originating from oral histories, indigenous legends, Christianity and death. In Mexico, he has exhibited his work in dozens of expositions and has won three national-level awards. His work has been featured in five books. Martinez's work has been exhibited in the United States, Colombia, Argentina, Lebanon, Germany, Spain, and Japan, with one of his latest exhibits in New York in 2008. In that same year, he created a mural in barro negro at the Baseball Academy in San Bartolo Coyotepec sponsored by the Alfredo Harp Helú Foundation.

== San Bartolo Coyotepec ==
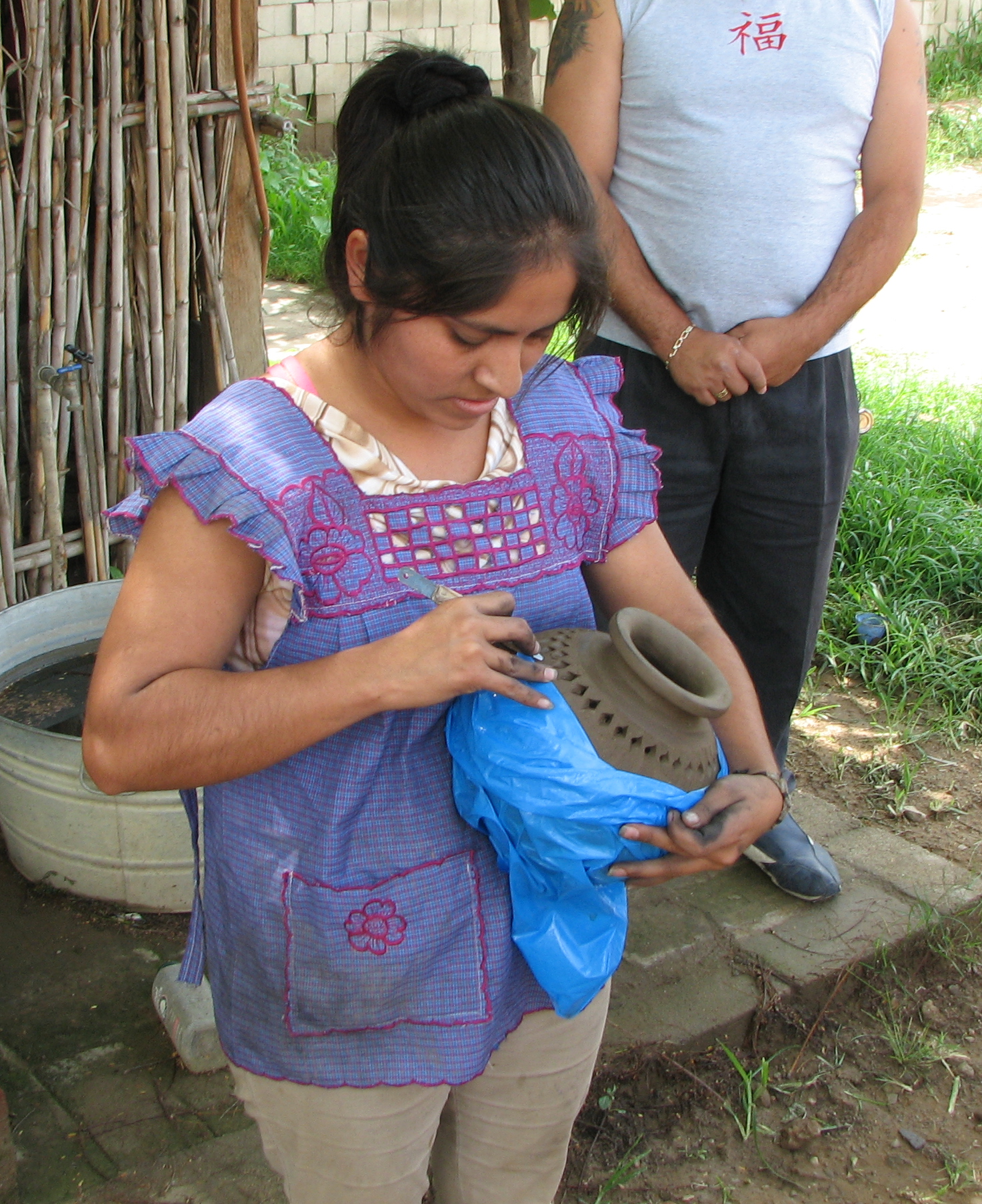
A woman cutting designs into unfired barro negro pottery in San Bartolo Coyotepec, Oaxaca, Mexico.

This style of pottery is made in San Bartolo Coyotepec and a large number of small communities in the surrounding valley, where the clay that gives it its color is found. This community is located 11 kilometres (6.8 mi) south of the city of Oaxaca, with about 600 families in the area dedicated to the craft. In addition to a number of family workshops, including Doña Rosa's, the Mercado de Artesanias is an important attraction which brings visitors from many parts of Mexico and other countries. A group of fourteen people exhibit and sell barro negro objects. Some of these products include vases, animal figures and jars. Demonstrations of pottery making are held there as well. In 2005, the Museo Estatal de Arte Popular de Oaxaca (State Museum of Popular Art) was opened here. It has one of its three halls dedicated to barro negro, with pieces from the Monte Albán era to the present day. In 2009, San Bartolo Coyotepec held its first Feria Artesanal de Barro Negro (Crafts Fair of Barro Negro) with the participation of over 150 artisans.

== Objects made with barro negro ==
Many different kinds of objects are made of barro negro including pots, whistles, flutes, bells, masks, lamps, animal figures with most being of a decorative nature and not for the storage of food and water. One exception to this is the use of cantaros from San Bartolo Coyotepec to age and store mezcal at many distilleries. These large jars are not polished and retain the ancient gray matte, which allows them to be resistant to liquid. Another quality the gray matte version has is that it can be struck similar to a bell, and the cantaros are also used as musical instruments. The sound produced is crystalline.

Another famous barro negro object is the "mezcal monkey" (chango mezcalero). This is a vessel created for the alcoholic liquor mezcal in the shape of a monkey. It is made to hold between 700 ml to 1 liter of the liquid with a cork or corncob stopper. It is either painted in bright colors or left grayish with detailed etchings. Valente Nieto, the sole surviving progeny of Doña Rosa, states that his family created the mezcal monkey. He claims that his father was a gifted sculptor, and mezcal owners came to their property requesting novelty bottles for the alcoholic beverage. The monkey as well as other animal shapes were created. However, another family, that of Marcelo Simon Galan, also claim to have created the container. His surviving granddaughter says that he made the shape at the request of a customer. An example of Galan's work is on display at the Museo de Arte Popular de Oaxaca in San Bartolo Coyotepec.

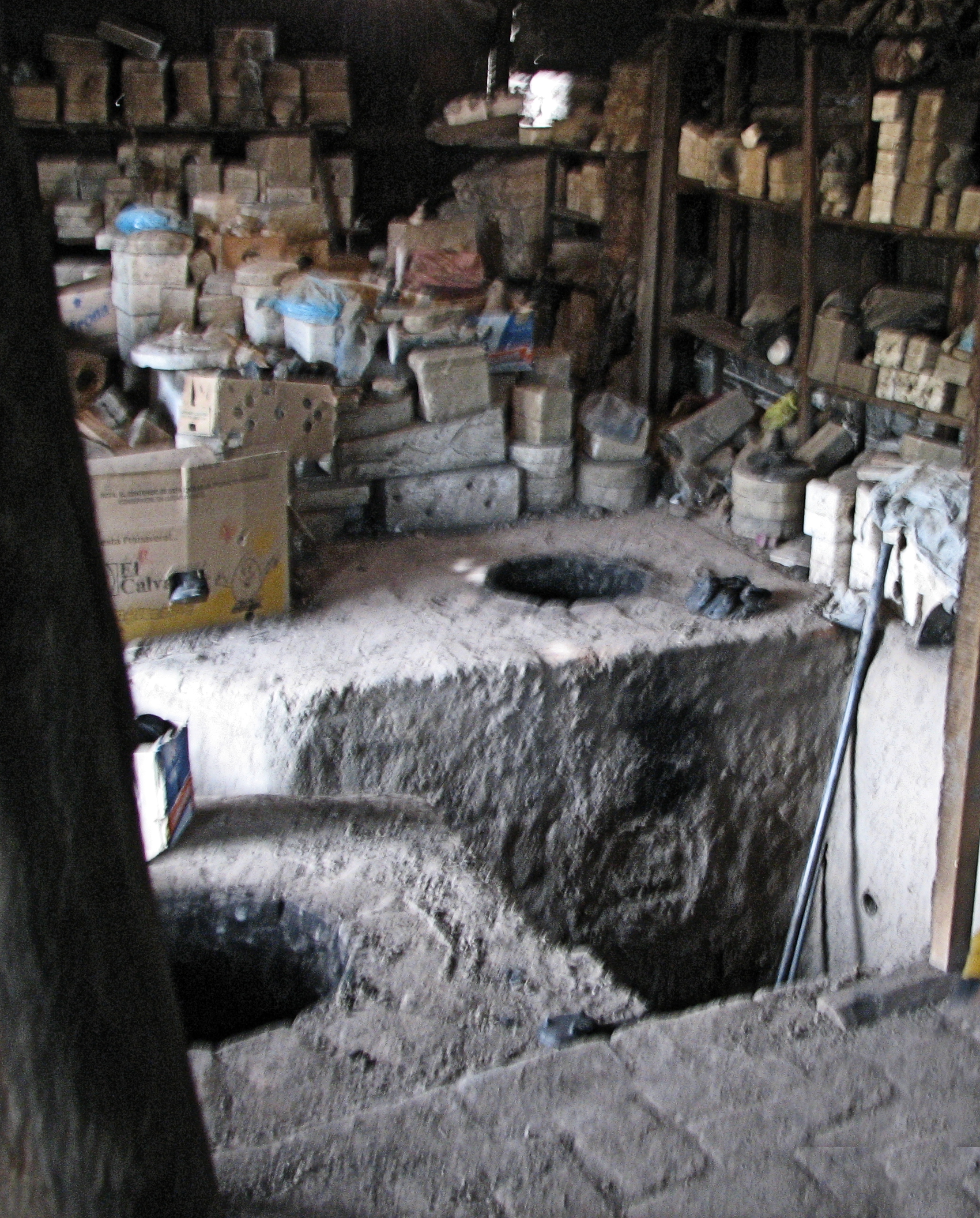
Underground pits in which cured barro negro pottery is fired.

== Process ==
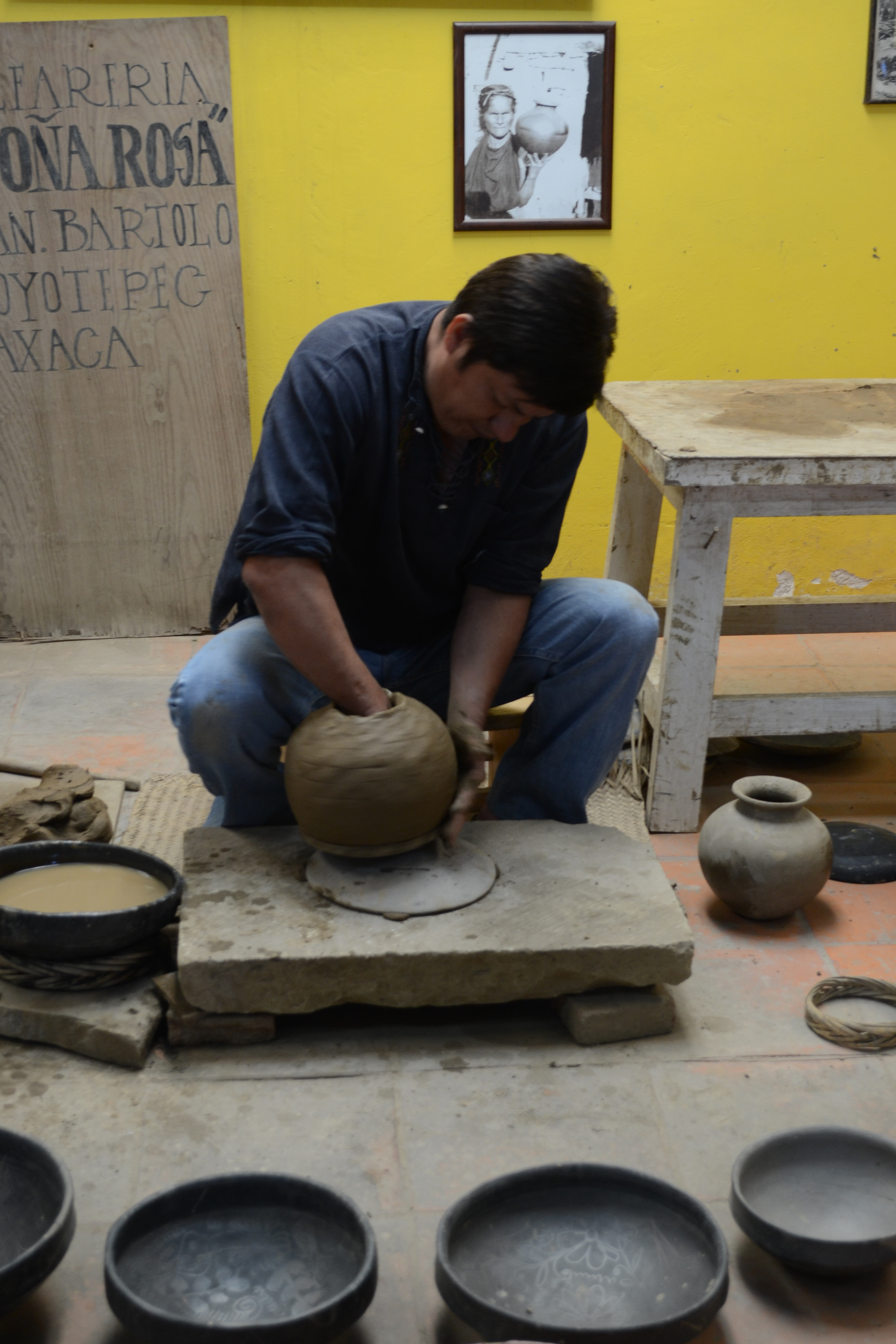
Creation of a pitcher at the Doña Rosa workshop

The clay that is found to make barro negro is found in recent alluvial valley deposits and is a product of disintegrated volcanic tuffs and finer sediments from gneisses. Many areas of the valley become covered with thick vegetation, with enough plants to cover the surface to cause deoxygenation. Deoxygenation occurs to the underlying sediment causing the red iron oxides to turn black. The color of barro negro is derived from the properties of the clay, and is not colored. The earth used to extract the clay is cleaned to remove impurities, which can take a month of soaking and settling out the clay from the rest of the soil. After this process, each piece takes about twenty days to complete.

Traditionally, the clay is molded on plates balanced on rocks to that they can be spun by hand. Modern potters' tools are not used. Large pieces, such as cantaros are fashioned from the bottom up, adding clay as the piece grows. After it is shaped, the pieces are set to dry in a well-insulated room to protect them from sudden changes in temperature. Drying can take up to three weeks. If the piece is to be polished so that it turns out shiny black when finished, it is polished when the piece is almost dry. The surface of the piece is lightly moistened and then rubbed with a curved quartz stone. This form of polishing is known as burnishing. Burnishing can take up to about one and a half hours. The purpose of burnishing is to reduce the porosity of the clay so that there is reduced absorption of moisture. Burnishing also causes any non-plastic materials into a parallel position. This compacts the surface of the clay and creates the metallic sheen and dark color during firing. This is also the stage when decorative accents such as clay flowers or small handles are added. The designs of barro negro objects are unique to this area.

The pieces are then fired in underground pits or above ground kilns, using wood fires that heat the objects to between 700 and 800 °C. When they emerge, the polished pieces are a shiny black and the unpolished ones have a grey matte finish.
