= Oaxacan cat-eyed snake =

Conservation status
- Vulnerable (IUCN 3.1)

Scientific classification
- Kingdom: Animalia
- Phylum: Chordata
- Class: Reptilia
- Order: Squamata
- Suborder: Serpentes
- Family: Colubridae
- Genus: Tantalophis; Duellman, 1958
- Species: T. discolor

Binomial name
- Tantalophis discolor (Günther, 1860)

Synonyms
- Leptodeira discolor; Leptodira discolor; Sibon discolor; Hypsiglena discolor; Pseudoleptodeira discolor

Species of snake

The Oaxacan cat-eyed snake (Tantalophis discolor) is a species of snake in the family Colubridae. It is the only species in the genus Tantalophis.

It is found in Mexico.
