= Oaxacan wedding =

Traditional arrangement

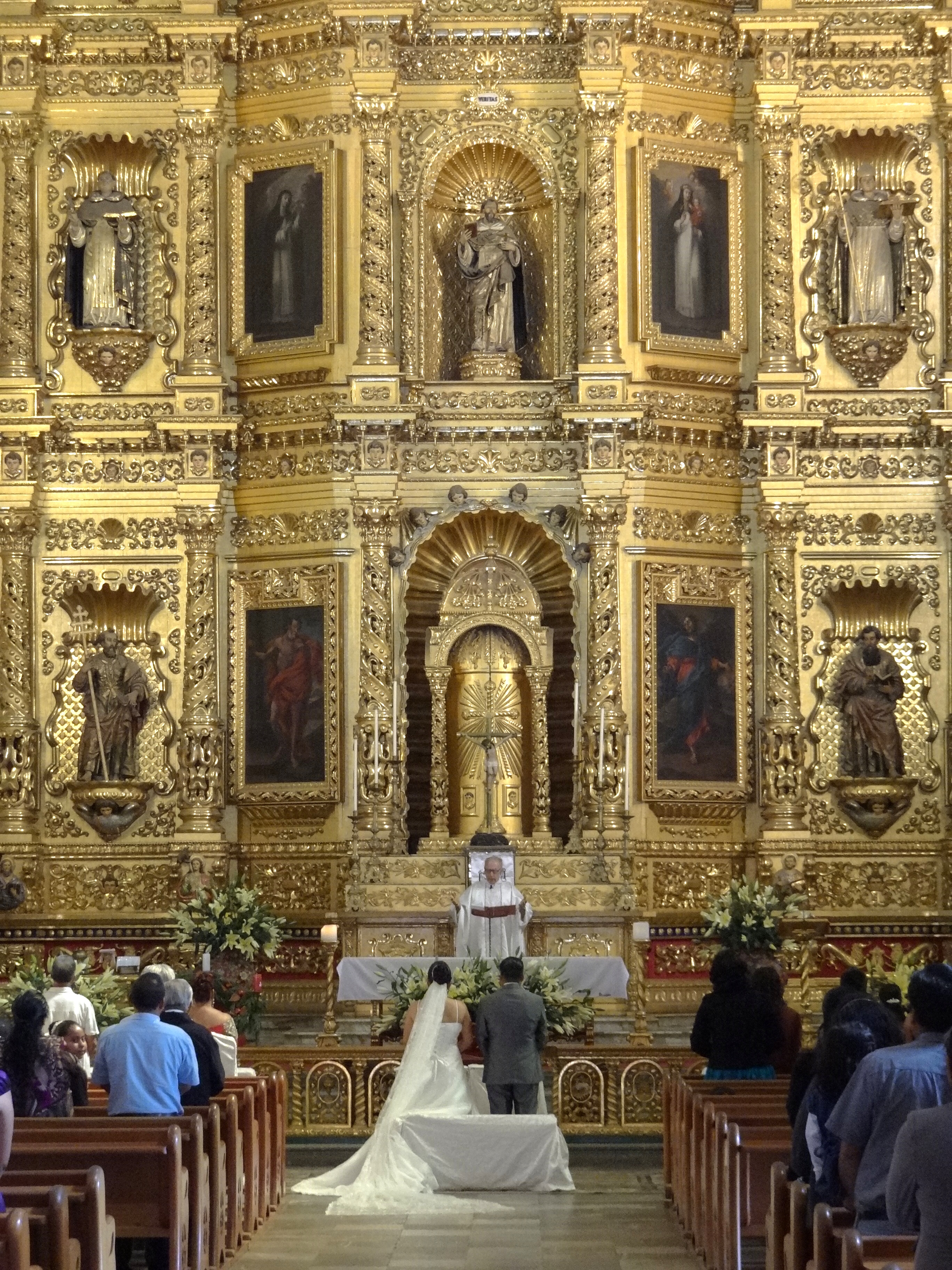
A wedding ceremony in Santo Domingo Temple, Oaxaca City

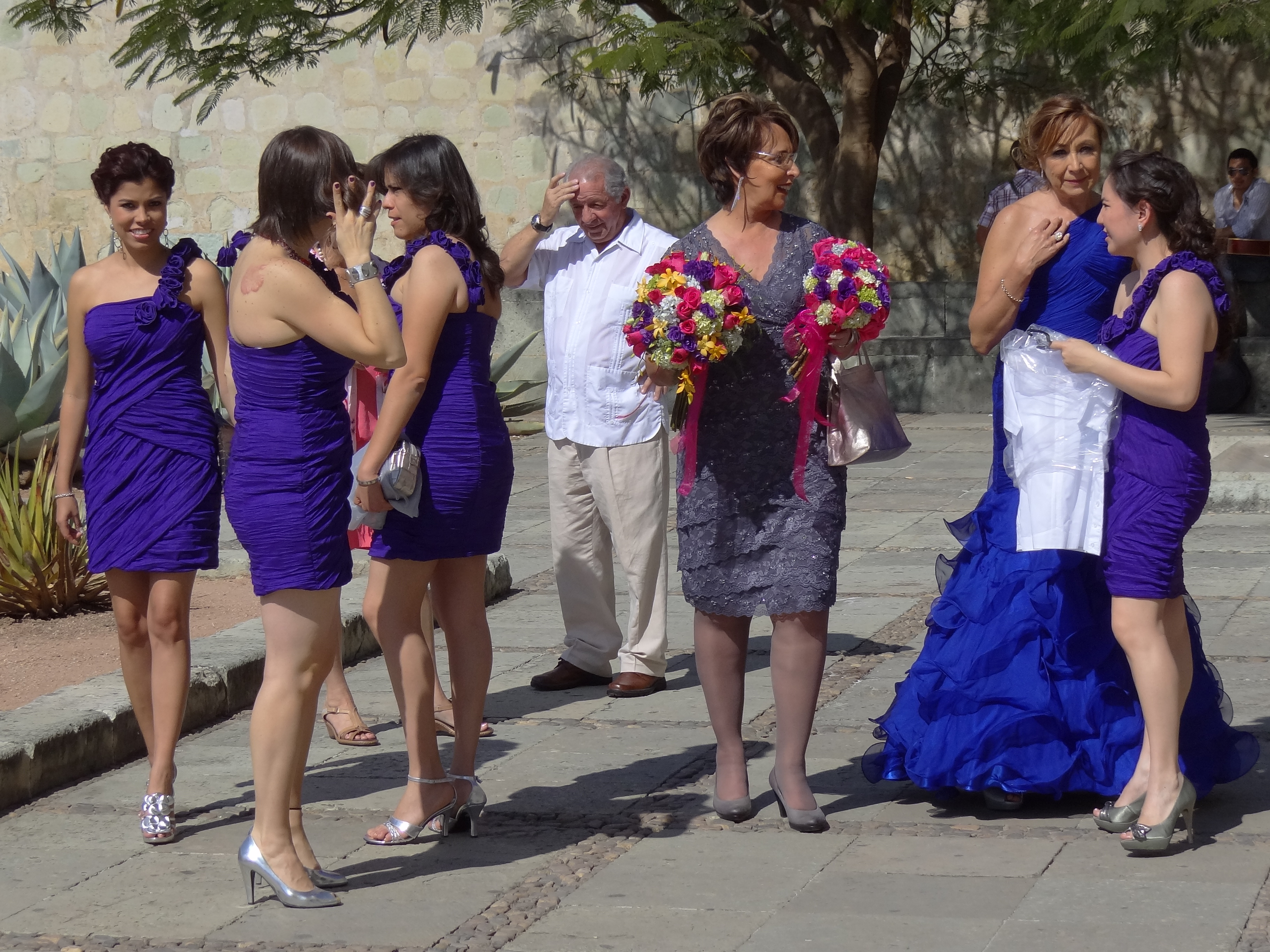
A wedding in Oaxaca City

An Oaxacan wedding is a traditional ritual that involves the participation of both the bride's and groom's family along with the community. The main decision makers of the wedding are the fathers of the groom and bride. The father of the groom must first ask for the bride's hand and if the bride's father accepts two weeks later they begin to arrange the wedding. If the case is that the groom does not have a father he can have an elder represent him. At this gathering the groom's side of the family brings with them fruits, bread, and alcoholic beverages. The godparents of both the bride and groom attend this gathering, who are the godparents of baptism, first communion, confirmation, as well as the new wedding godparents of the couple. The godparents are chosen by the couple usually because of a blood tie or a friendship. After this the groom must show his commitment to his bride's family by doing any chores the bride's family needs until the wedding date. The chores can vary from sweeping to helping the father in law with work in the ranch.

The beginning of the celebration begins around six or seven in the morning when the groom's family goes to the bride's house. They bring 12 turkeys, pan de yema, chocolate, tlayudas, and ingredients to make the traditional mole dish as offerings. Minutes later the groom and godparents arrive with a band. As soon as everyone is present at the bride's house the godparents and parents, along with other relatives, provide their blessings for the couple. Once this aspect is completed everyone comes together at the catholic wedding ceremony.

As everyone walks to the church the band plays. The groom and bride walk in front of the band to announce their wedding. Bands are an important component to the wedding as it brings life to the celebration of unity between a man and woman.

== Ceremony ==
The Catholic wedding ceremony commences around eight or nine in the morning and is held in Spanish, which is the only time Spanish is spoken throughout the wedding. For most Oaxacans Spanish isn't their first language. Oaxaca is a state with many different indigenous groups, each one with their own language and tradition. The most common known indigenous groups are the Zapotecs and Mixtecs, both whose primary language is not Spanish.

After the wedding all the guests, which include family and friends of the groom and bride, walk to the godparents house. As soon as everyone gets to the house the band plays a song called the Paloma. This is the time when breakfast is given to more than 100 guests consisting of pan de yema and a large bowl of hot chocolate. It is tradition that the godparents serve the newly couple the pan de yema and chocolate. The couples share their food as a symbolic meaning of unity between a man and wife. Aside from breakfast lunch is also provided. The dish that is served depends on the choice of the godparents. Fruit is also given that is accompanied with the band playing the Paloma once more. This part of the celebration ends with fireworks that are exploded.

The next part of the celebration continues at the house of the groom, which happens around three in the afternoon. At this moment dinner is prepared and once more the godparents serve the groom and the bride. The traditional dish that is given is mole and egadito.

== Food and drink ==
Mole is a typical dish from the area of Oaxaca and Puebla. The state of Oaxaca is called “land of the seven moles” with mole negro, Colorado, amarillo, verde, chichilo, coloradito, and mancha manteles. Mole is a sauce used for cooking meats such as pork and chicken and is used in various Mexican dishes. There are several variations of mole including mole negro and mole poblano which use many different chiles and herbs from the area. Mole negro is one of the more difficult dishes to make which includes chocolate, garlic, chili, and herbs.

Egadito on the other hand is a dish that has eggs, green tomato, and chicken. Oaxacans eat egadido with clayados, homemade tortillas, that is one of the common foods among all Oaxacans. The typical fruit juices served at dinner and throughout the wedding include horchata, tamarindo, chilacayota, zapote negro, and Jamaica.

As soon as everyone has finished dinner, all the guests walk back to the godparents house. Here the bride dances with the guests of the godparents. The dancing with the bride lasts around one hour. The last place the guests head to is the groom's house, which is where the dancing component begins. To start off the night the male godparent and the father of the groom and bride make a toast with a cup of Mezcal.

Mezcal is a typical alcoholic drink that characterizes Oaxacan weddings, which is extracted from the maguey plant native to Mexico. The drink is popular throughout Mexico but derives from Oaxaca where the majority is produced. Mezcal is made in similar manner for centuries, from the heart of the plant known as “la piña,” and is becoming a popular export of Mexico. There are several subtypes such as guasno, tobalá, pechuga, blanco, minero, cedrón, de alacran, and ad crème de café.

Originally Mezcal was from the sacred maguey plant in Mexico and was thought to give supernatural power to religious rituals and this is why it is important in a Oaxacan wedding. The Spaniards called them aguardientes, or fire waters. It's produced by methods taught down through generations within Oaxaca. The piñas are collected and smashed by a stone and left to ferment after they are cooked for three days in earth ovens. Mezcal is exported to the United States and Japan among other places, and is becoming known as a cultural symbol of the bottle having the larvae in the bottom. Mezcal is usually taken in a straight shot, not in a mixed drink. Some add salt, lime, and orange slices with it as well as acknowledge the blessings and rituals that it is known for. One tradition is to throw a small amount on the ground as a gift to the goddess of maguey. Mezcal is served with a side plate of fried larvae ground with chili peppers, salt, and limes.

== Dance ==
After the toast the elders start off by dancing to el jarabe. This jarabe can last around 30 minutes. El jarabe as well as other dance traditions have become a prevalent part of Oaxacan wedding culture. The typical Oaxacan wedding has phases of music, where the band is coming on and off all throughout the night. Mostly mariachi is played providing fun upbeat rhythm for all ages to enjoy. The bands usually plays in the latter part of the evening after the reception. Guitars, violins, trumpets, and marimba are added to give a cultural flare to the event. The main form of entertainment that keeps the festivities alive is the music and dancing at Oaxacan weddings.

The elders wear crowns on their heads during the dance, which are similar to what Olympic winners wear. The newly married couple plays a role in the dance by walking around the dance floor. The godparents also participate the dance; their role being to throw candy to the guests. As soon as the elders finish dancing the floor is for everyone to enjoy. After the dancing the brindis, or toast, comes next. The father of the bride thanks everyone for coming to the wedding and proposes a toast for the newly wed couple.

The Vals, a waltz, follows after the toast. The Vals is designed to be the last dance between a father and daughter. After this dance, a whole circle forms with the couple in the center. Anyone is able to jump in to dance with the bride or groom at any time. This vals can last for 30 minutes. Once done the vibora de la mara, or snake dance, begins. Here the bride and groom hold up the brides dress and the guests go underneath one by one by holding hands. The idea of this dance has elements of tradition as well as humor and entertainment for family and friends at the wedding.

Last is the cutting of cake. The cake is usually a traditional Mexican cake of tres leches, or three milks. It has several layers, with the figures of the bride and groom on top of the cake. The cake is large enough to serve over 100 people, as many guests come to Oaxacan weddings. The bride and groom cut the cake together and the couple can choose to have their faces shoved into the cake before it's served, or not. After this the couple take pictures with their godparents, parents, family members, and friends.

== Familial importance ==
The wedding continues on to the next day, where the bride makes atole, a drink that includes masa, water, piloncillo cinnamon, vanilla and chocolate, for all the remaining guests. After this the remaining guests and the couple go to the cemetery to remember their loved ones that were not able to be physically present at the wedding. Food, flowers, and Mezcal are brought to the cemetery as offering to the dead. This part of the wedding is similar to el Día de Muertos.

To end the wedding the couple go with their families to thank their godparents for accepting to be their wedding godparents one week later. Oaxacans take the role of godparents seriously, since it is a form of compadrazgo, kinship, between families and for this reason thanking someone for their participation as a godparent is crucial.
