= Museo Estatal de Arte Popular de Oaxaca =

Museum in San Bartolo Coyotepec

Coordinates: 16°57′29.63″N 96°42′28.15″W

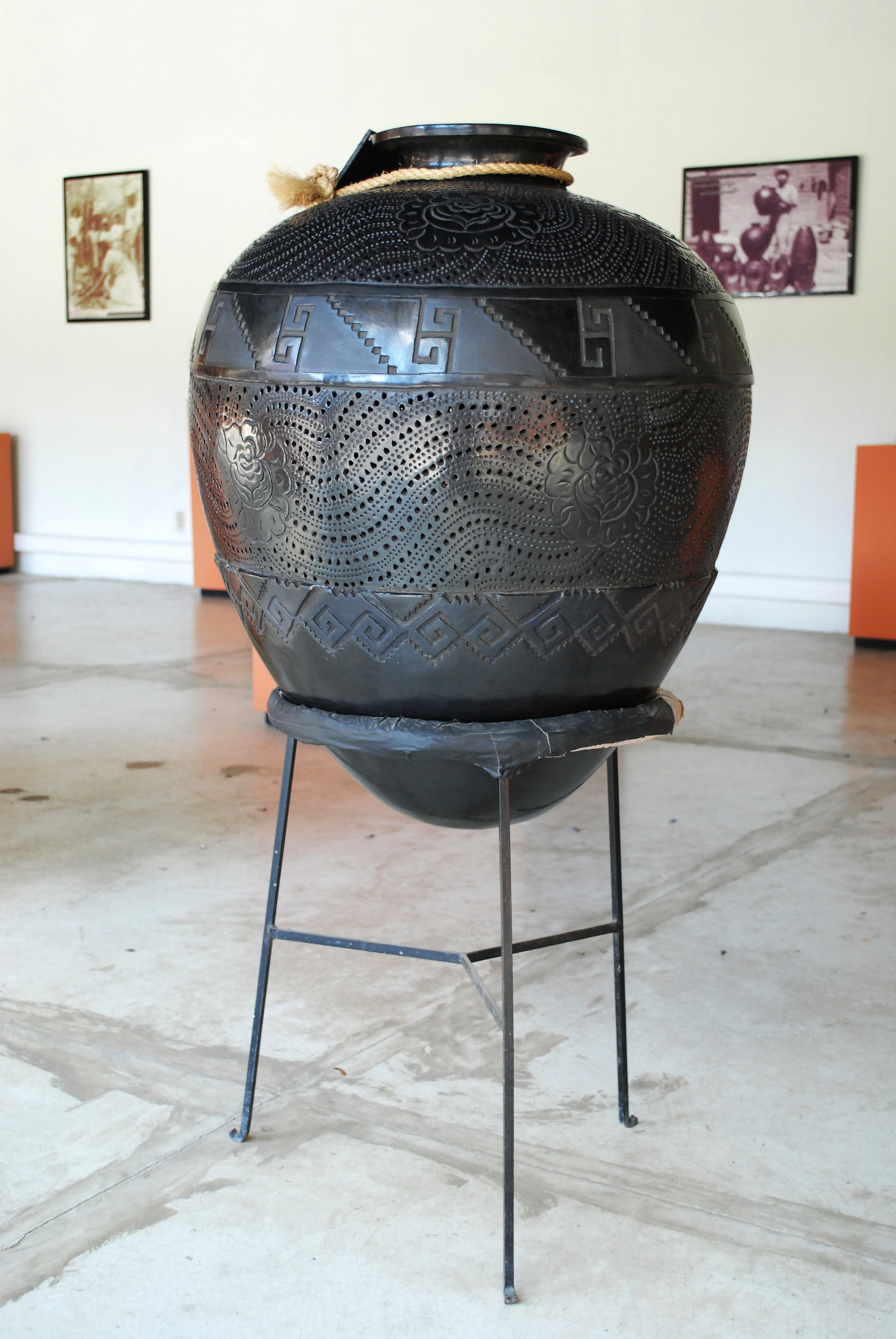
Large barro negro "cantaro" jar on display at the museum

The Museo Estatal de Arte Popular de Oaxaca (State Museum of Popular Art of Oaxaca) or MEAPO is a small museum in the municipality of San Bartolo Coyotepec just south of the city of Oaxaca in Mexico. It is run by the state of Oaxaca to showcase the entity's handcrafts and folk art tradition, through its permanent collection, online "cyber-museum", collaboration with national and international entities, and sponsorship of events such as craft markets, conferences, and temporary exhibitions. It is dedicated to the crafts and to the artisans and the cultures behind the items. Its collection contains samples of most of the crafts produced in the state, especially the Central Valleys region, but most of its collection consists of barro negro pottery, the specialty of San Bartolo Coyotepec. It is run by director Carlomagno Pedro Martínez, a recognized artisan and artist in barro negro.

== The organization ==
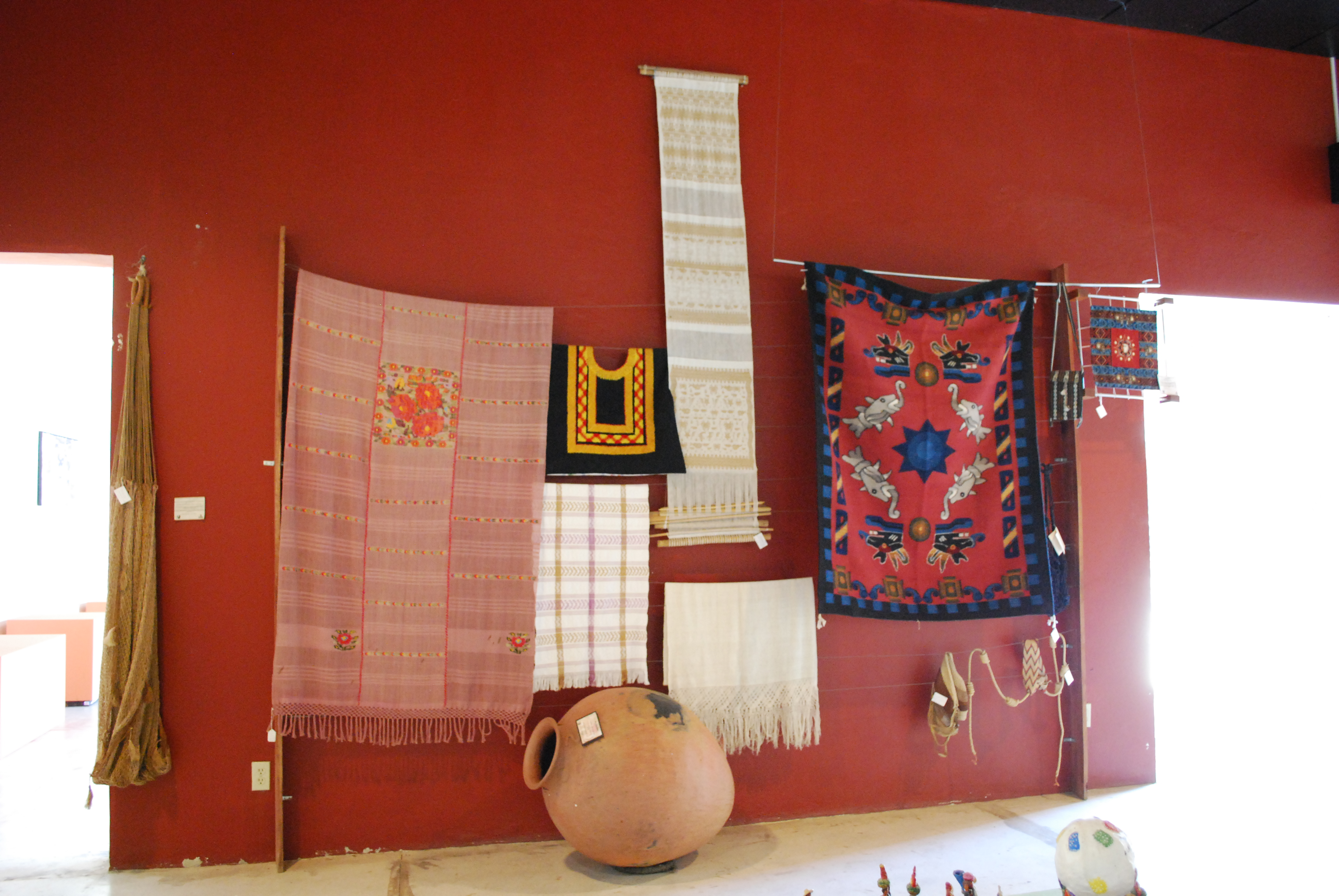
Textiles on display at the museum

The Museo Estatal de Arte Popular de Oaxaca (State Museum of Popular Art of Oaxaca) or MEAPO is a small museum in San Bartolo Coyotepec just south of the city of Oaxaca. It is on the south side of the main plaza of the town, on the former grounds of the Constancia y Progeso School.

The main purpose of the museum is to conserve and promote Oaxacan handcrafts, folk arts and the artisans, as they are an important part of the state's culture and economy. The museum is also a venue to promote new folk/popular artists. The permanent displays trace the history of Oaxaca handcrafts and folk art from the early pre-Hispanic period to the present day. The museum is sponsored by government agencies with foreign foundations with the aim of growing its collection and to hold events and other activities to promote traditional Oaxacan crafts and the people who make them.

The museum works to build collaborative partnerships such as that they hold with the Friends of Oaxacan Folk Art association based in New York City. This organization has worked with the museum on projects such as scholarships, five of which valued at 10,000 pesos each were authorized in 2008 for the training of young artists.

== Facility and collection ==
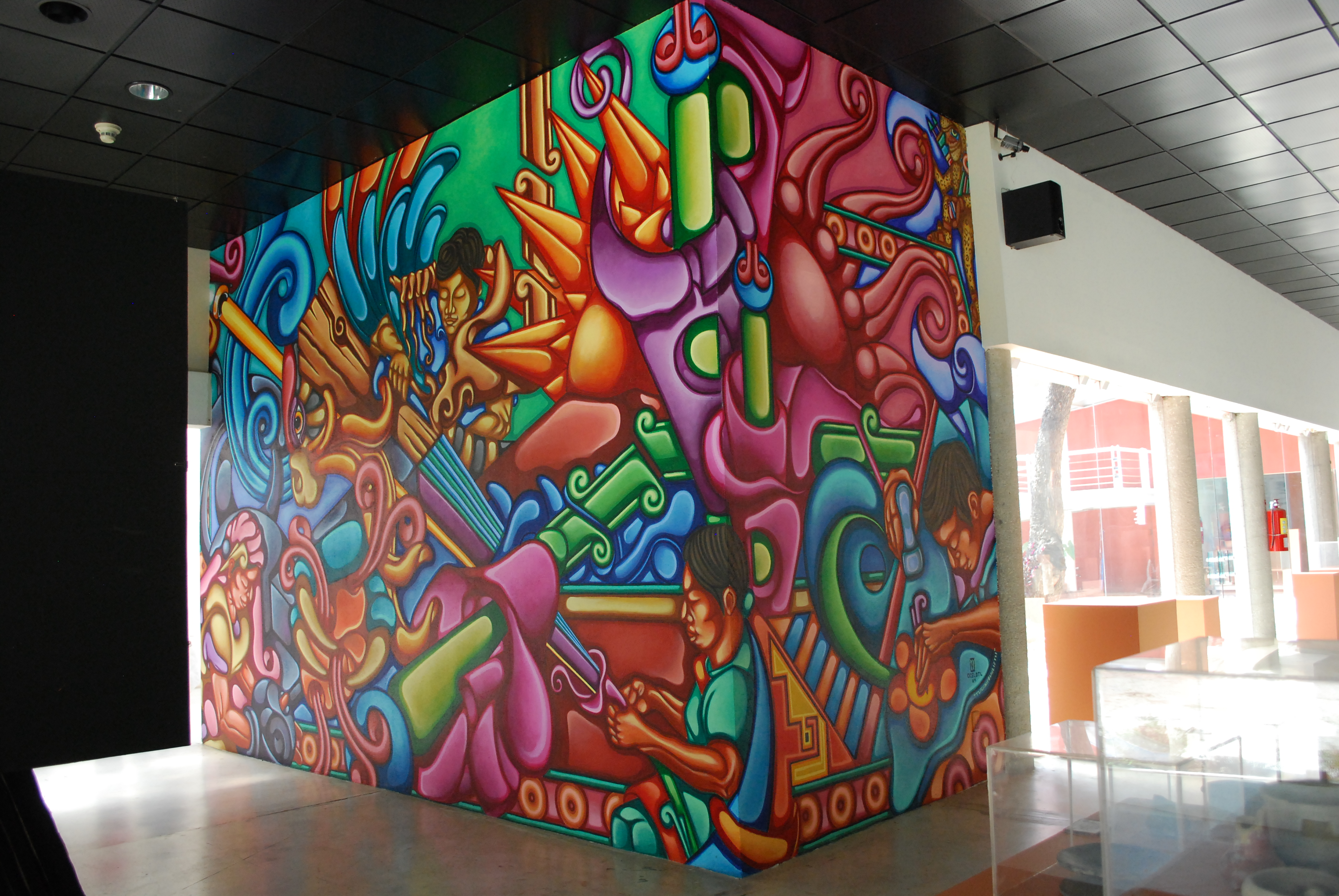
Entrance hall of the museum

The physical museum has three permanent halls and a permanent collection that focuses on the common crafts of the state of Oaxaca. Its largest collection is of barro negro pottery, which is the most important handcraft produced in San Bartolo Coyotepec. The collection includes 120 pieces made by 37 artisans in the municipality. These pieces were selected for their aesthetic qualities with many having participated in state, national, and international competitions.

Another important segment of the collection was donated by the Artesanías e Industrias Populares del Estado de Oaxaca (ARIPO). This consists of 99 pieces from eight regions of Oaxaca and includes pieces made of ceramic, palm, cornhusks, tin and crafts related to fireworks.

Due to lack of space, the museum cannot display all of its collection at one time in the permanent halls. However, images of many items are available online at MEAPO's permanent "cyber-museum." They cyber-museum at museo-meapo.com was created by MEAPO staff with Gema Ríos Rosario, who worked on it as part of her master's thesis. The purpose of the site is to allow a wider audience to view and study the museum's collection. According to the museum, it "transforms the visitor into an active agent," as s/he navigates the site. The cyber-museum is part of the museum's efforts to promote a dynamic image with attractive, interested and novel content, emphasizing the artistic value of the artisans and their works.

== Carlomagno Pedro Martínez ==
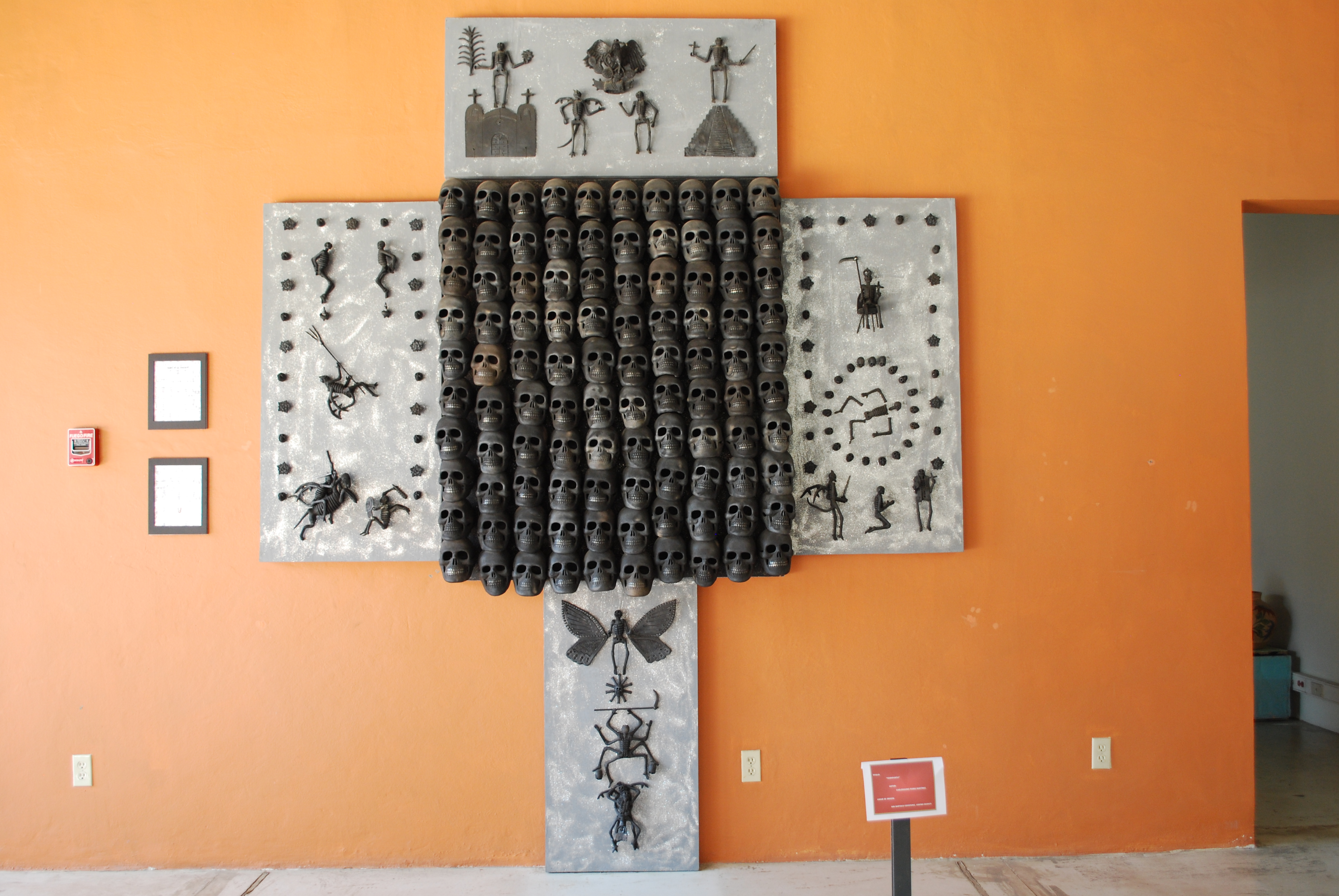
Work called "Tzompantli" by Carlomagno Pedro Martinez on display at the museum

MEAPO's director is artist and artisan Carlomagno Pedro Martínez, a native of San Bartolo Coyotepec and one of the forces behind the founding of the museum in its current form. In addition to being the director, Martínez is an accomplished artist and artisan. His training began in his family's barro negro workshop, but he extended this with artistic training at the Taller de Artes Plásticas Rufino Tamayo. Since then, Martínez has produced many pieces in barro negro, many of which are completely artistic. His work began winning awards in 1985 when he was only 20, and soon became known for his skulls created in the medium. Starting in 1989, his work has been shown abroad in the United States, South America, the Middle East, Europe and Asia where he has given classes, conferences and workshops. He has done painting but very little, preferring sculpting in clay. In 2008, he was commissioned to create a sculpted mural in barro negro for the San Bartolo Coyotepec Baseball Academy by the Alfredo Harp Helú Foundation.

== Events ==
Over its first five years, the museum has hosted about 50 expositions with the aim of creating the opportunity to get to know the works and the artisans in their social context. According to director Martínez, the purpose of the temporary exhibits are to allow for young and relatively unknown popular artists a chance to get feedback on their work. He states that the field of popular art is changing in Oaxaca with contemporary artists getting involved with artisans. Temporary exhibits in the museum have been sponsored by institutions such as the Fondo Regional Zona Centro, the Consejo Nacional para la Cultura y las Artes (Conaculta) and the Secretaría de las Culturas y Artes de Oaxaca (Seculta).

The museum has held and continues to hold events related to Oaxaca's crafts and the culture behind them. The museum has sponsored international shows of Oaxacan work. It has sponsored sales of crafts such as the crafts "tianguis" (traditional open air market) in coordination with civil associations such as Raíces de Oaxaca. In conjunction with the development of the cyber-museum, it held a conference called "The museum as an element of reflection in the digital age." It was presented by Gema Ríos Rosario from UAM along the museum.

One temporary exhibit was in the fine arts, featuring the work of artist Rosendo Vega. He is originally from Guerrero but has lived in Oaxaca over a decade and his work reflects the Oaxaca worldview according to Carlomagno Pedro Martínez. Some of the museum's temporary exhibits link Oaxaca's crafts with those in the rest of Mexico. In 2010, the museum held an exhibit on marionettes, with samples from parts of Mexico as well as Oaxaca, for a collection of about 30 puppets. The display was created for Children's Month with the cooperation of the marionette performing company called "La bruja." In 2011, the museum sponsored an exhibition called "Extensiones" which was a collection of works by young artists from the neighboring state Puebla, presenting their concept of society.

== History ==
Although its current incarnation has been in existence since 2004, the origins of the museum extend back to 1905. At this time, a resident named Manuel Guzmán donated a plot of land to found a cultural center, along with books to start a library. However, this donation was used to build a school instead.

Much later, in the 1990s, there was a push by a local youth organization to establish a museum on the same site dedicated to San Bartolo Coyotepec's barro negro pottery tradition. With the help of an agency called the Consejo Indígena del Pueblo this museum was inaugurated in 1994. It was begun with a donation of items from San Bartolo Coyotepec and other artisans in the Central Valleys region of Oaxaca with academics, intellectuals and others. Later, the museum began to be a center for the sale of pottery and other handcrafts from the same region.

The museum grew; it struggled due to the lack of funding and from administrative problems. Carlomagno Pedro Martínez became involved at this time, raising money from the Mexican community in the United States to help keep the museum afloat.

By the early 2000s, continued financial problems plus disputes over use of the space led to the decision to close the community museum and build a new one sponsored by the state government. In 2002, the original museum collection was put in storage and remained there until the new and current MEAPO museum was constructed then inaugurated in 2004. It remains today, under the operation of the state's Comisión del Patrimonio Edificado del Estado de Oaxaca (COPAE) agency. During the museum's first five years, the number of visitors has risen with peak visitation during holidays as tourists visit the town of San Bartolo Coyotepec.
