= Friends of Oaxacan Folk Art =

Mexican non-profit organization

- Founded: 2007
- Type: Cultural
- Location: 275 Central Park West #1-C New York, NY. 10024
- Coordinates: 40°47′11″N 73°58′08″W
- Region served: United States and Oaxaca, Mexico
- Key people: President - Arden Aibel Rothstein
- Website: www.fofa.us

Friends of Oaxacan Folk Art is a non-profit organization dedicated to promoting the traditional handcrafts and folk art of the Mexican state of Oaxaca, especially to encourage young artisans to continue family and regional traditions.

The organization was established in 2007 by American writers, art historian, educators, gallery owners and collectors, many of whom have long-standing relationship with Oaxacan artisans. The organization collaborates with the Museo Estatal de Arte Popular de Oaxaca (MEAPO), especially its director Carlomagno Pedro Martínez.

Since 2010, the organization has held competitions for young Oaxacan artisans in conjunction with the Museo Estatal de Arte Popular de Oaxaca. They also sponsor sales of Oaxacan crafts and folk art in Brooklyn, New York. Proceeds from these sales go to support Oaxacan artisans, especially to encourage up-and-coming ones.
