= Carlomagno Pedro Martínez =

Mexican artist and artisan

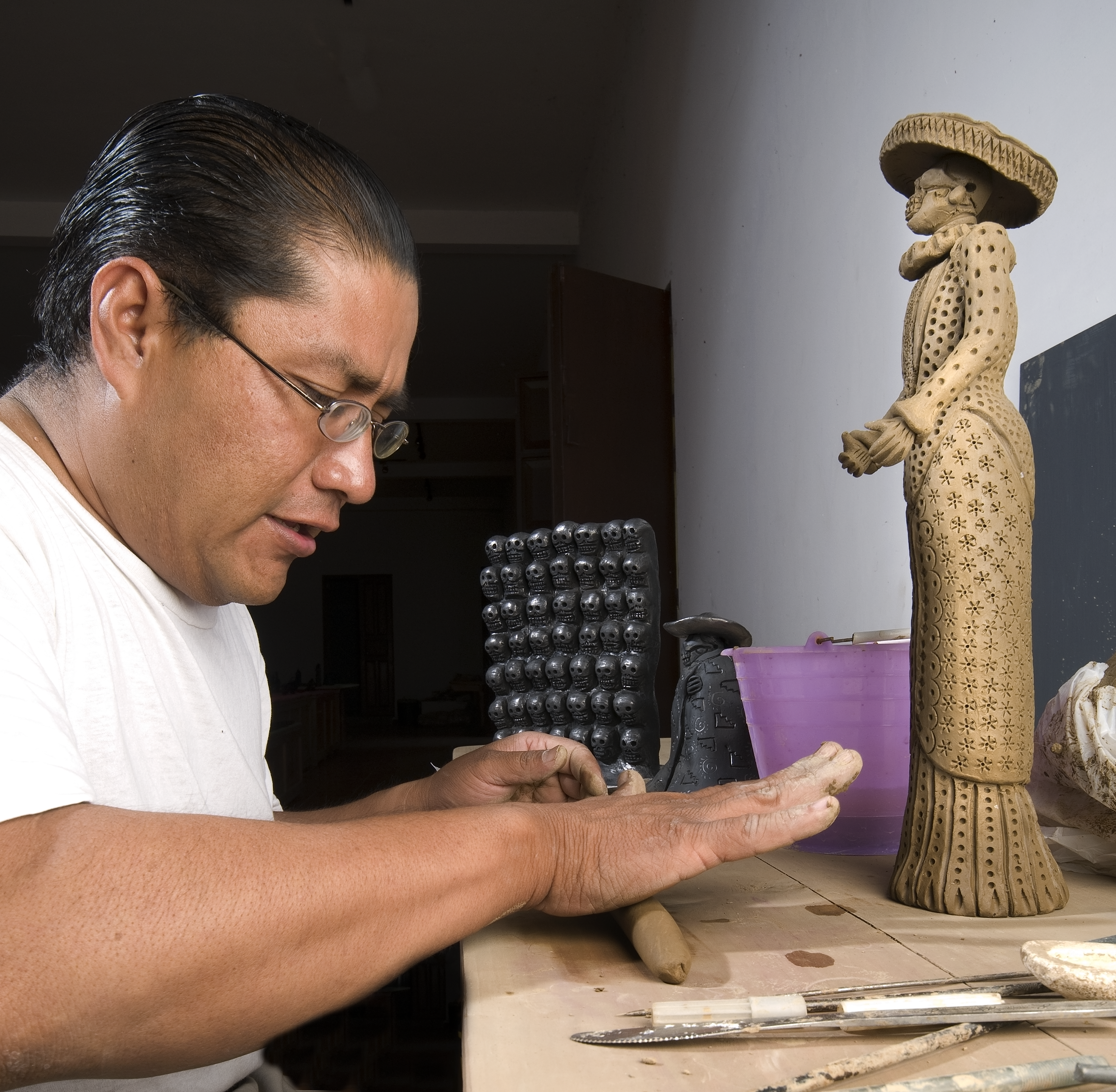
- The artisan in his workshop
- Born: August 17, 1965 (age 61); San Bartolo Coyotepec
- Movement: Barro negro pottery
- Awards: National Prize for Arts and Sciences (Mexico) 2014

Carlomagno Pedro Martínez (born August 17, 1965) is a Mexican artist and artisan in “barro negro” ceramics from San Bartolo Coyotepec, in the Mexican state of Oaxaca. He comes from a family of potters in a town noted for the craft. He began molding figures as a child and received artistic training when he was 18. His work has been exhibited in Mexico, the U.S. and Europe and he has been recognized as an artist as well as an artisan. Today, he is also the director of the Museo Estatal de Arte Popular de Oaxaca (MEAPO) in his hometown. In 2014, Martínez was awarded Mexico's National Prize for Arts and Sciences

== Formation ==
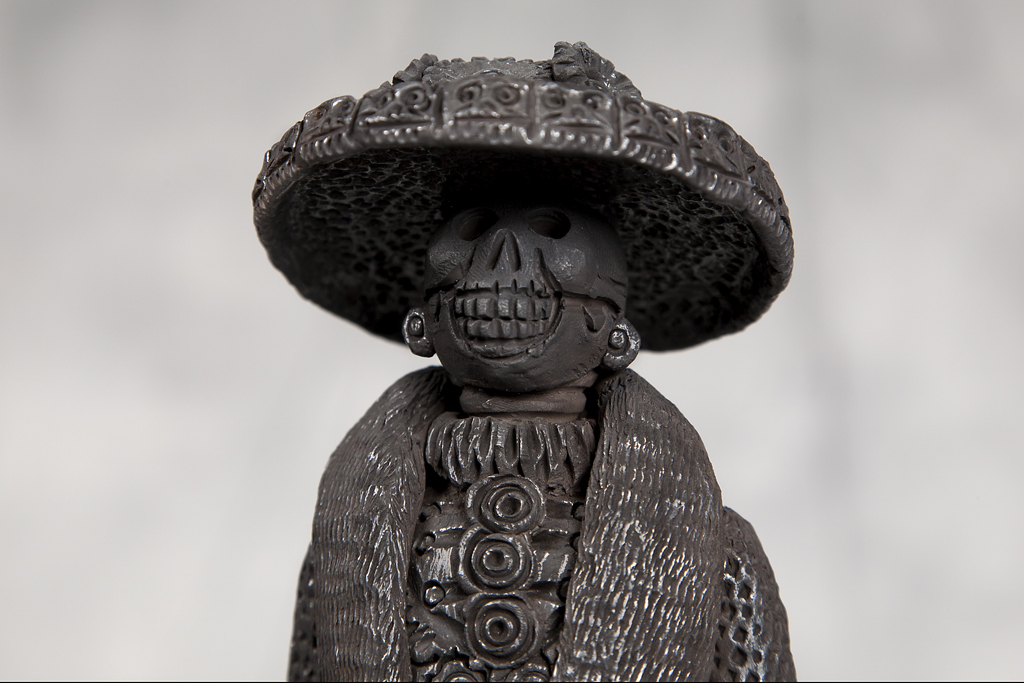
Detail of a Catrina figure in barro negro by the artisan

Carlomagno grew up in San Bartolo Coyotepec which has a ceramics tradition that extends back to the pre Hispanic period. The local speciality is “barro negro” or black clay, which gets its color from the properties of the clay when handled in a specific way. Most potters still use techniques from the pre Hispanic period, especially in molding although there have been innovations in firing. His grandparents as well as parents, Antonio Eleazar Pedro Carreño and Glafira Martínez Barranco, worked the local clay. His father began experimenting with more creative forms in order to earn more money for the family’s work and both parents taught their children to be proud of the work they do.

His first name, Carlomagno, is the Spanish version of Charlemagne who his grandmother Magdalena Carreño admired greatly. His father gave him the name in honor of his mother.

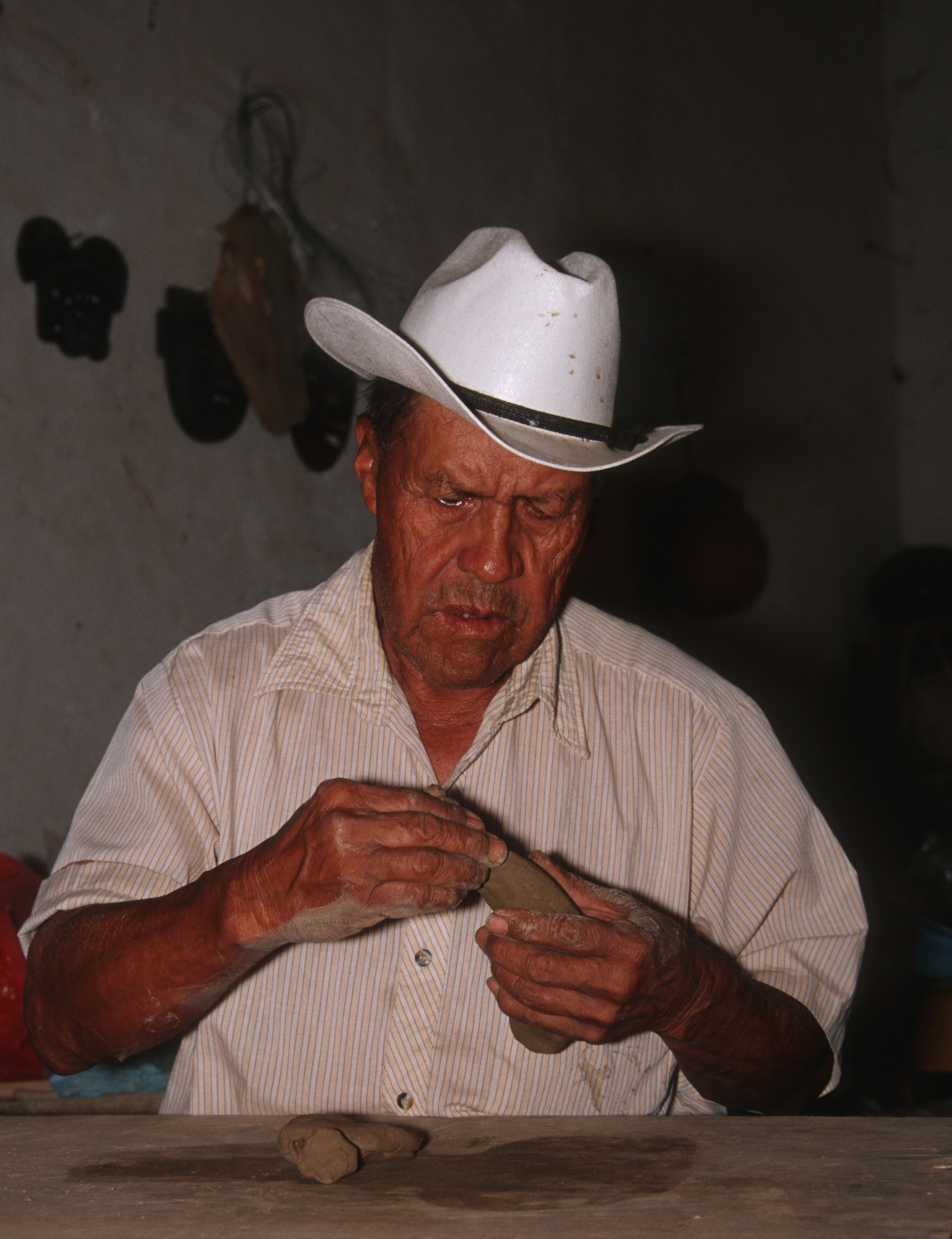
Father Eleazar Pedro Carreño

Carlomagno began to work with ceramics when he was a child, making figures such as Aztec warriors, Mexican soldiers and clowns, based on images he saw in books. In 1982, when he was 18, he enrolled in the Rufino Tamayo Workshop in the city of Oaxaca. This training allowed him to learn to bridge the gap between handcrafts/folk art and fine art. He received the Premio Nacional de La Juventud Presidencia de la República in 1987 which led to a scholarship to student in the United States from the US Embassy in Mexico in 1989.

When he was 31, he began teaching classes to children in Coyotepec, which led to the formation of a large group concentrated on creating figures in clay, which he himself was learning to use the potters’ wheel.

== Inspiration and creation ==
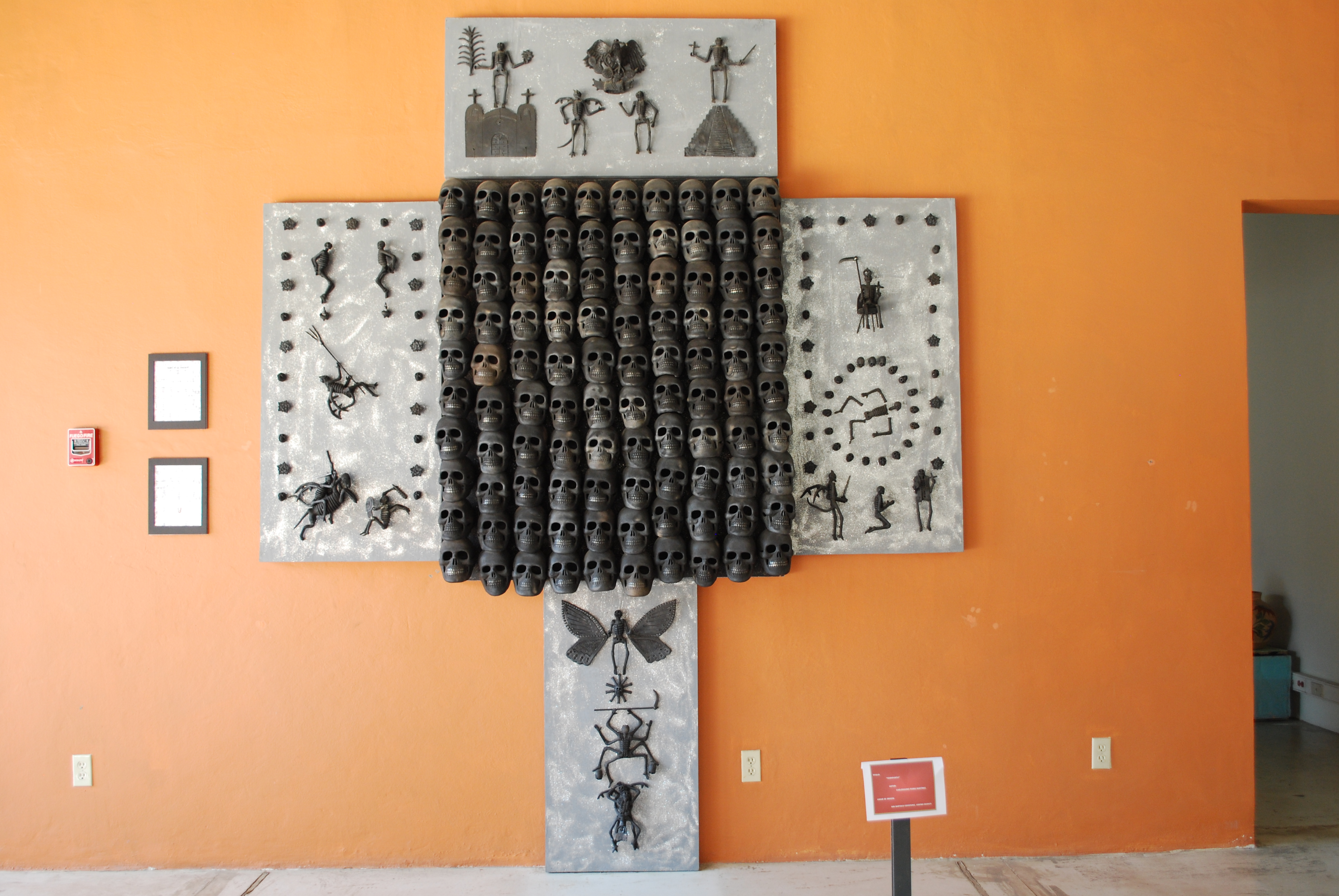
"Tzompantli" at the Museo Estatal de Arte Popular de Oaxaca.

Carlomagno states that he uses the clay to express his emotions much the ways other paint or write. Although most of his pieces are based on traditional characters of Oaxaca, they also include humorous depictions of modern personalities and events. His pieces are primarily based on local legends and myths as well as mestizo religious traditions such as the burial of Jesus, and Christ on the cross. One of Carlomagno’s inspirations for his work has been local festival and carnivals. One of these is the feast day of his hometown to honor Saint Peter. Another theme that recurs in his work is that of death, but they are not dramatic or grotesque. One reason for the theme is that it complements the color, which can give a sense of mystery. Two of his popular figures is called “Nuestra Abuela” (Our Grandmother), which is a representation of death and the Zapotec god of fire. He has created sculpted versions of figures drawn by José Guadalupe Posada and Francisco Goitia .

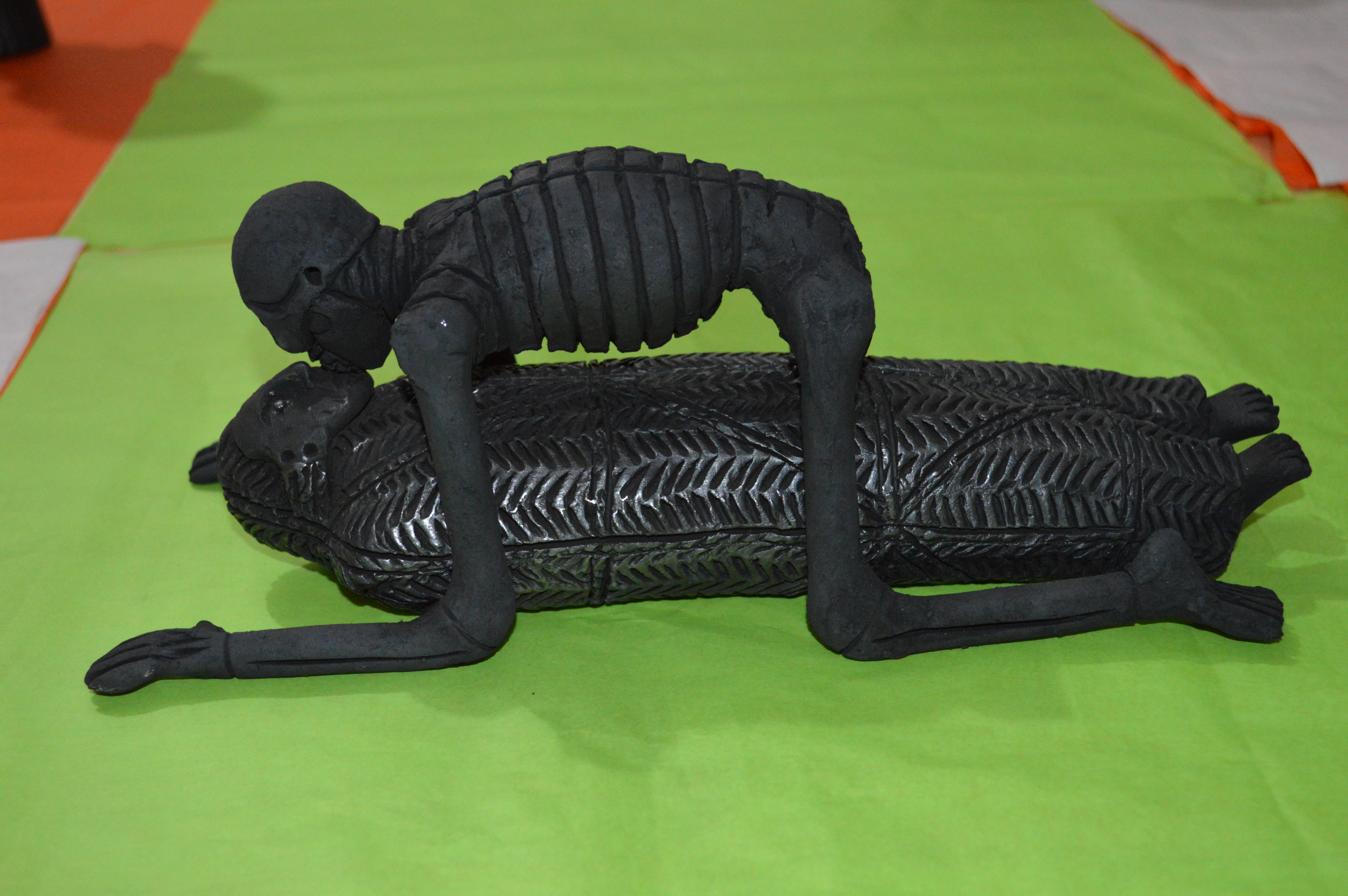
Skeletal figure with mummy on display at the workshop

He has also created murals and other artworks in barro negro, many of which use the brilliance of the medium to play with the light. Currently, much of his inspiration comes from other parts of Mexico. Carlomagno creates pieces for special orders. Some of these have included historical and cultural figures, which have been exhibited in museums and galleries in Mexico and abroad and many are part of private collections. His work has been featured in locations such as the Mexican Fine Arts Center Museum in Chicago, the Galería de la Raza in San Francisco and the Laumeier Sculpture Park in Saint Louis, Missouri.

Carlomagno’s work is always done completely by hand with the aim of not repeating a piece he had done before exactly. After modeling, the piece is left to dry completely then fired in an underground oven. This oven is completely sealed to limit the amount of oxygen inside and allows for the black color of the pieces. In 1990, during the Encuentro Nacional de Arte Joven in Aguascalientes, Carlomagno’s work caught the attention of painter Manuel Felguérez and art critic Teresa del Conde, who debated whether Carlomagno should be considered an artist or artisan. Oaxaca painter Francisco Toledo considers him to be an artist and has worked to get his pieces shown in Europe.

== Works and exhibitions ==
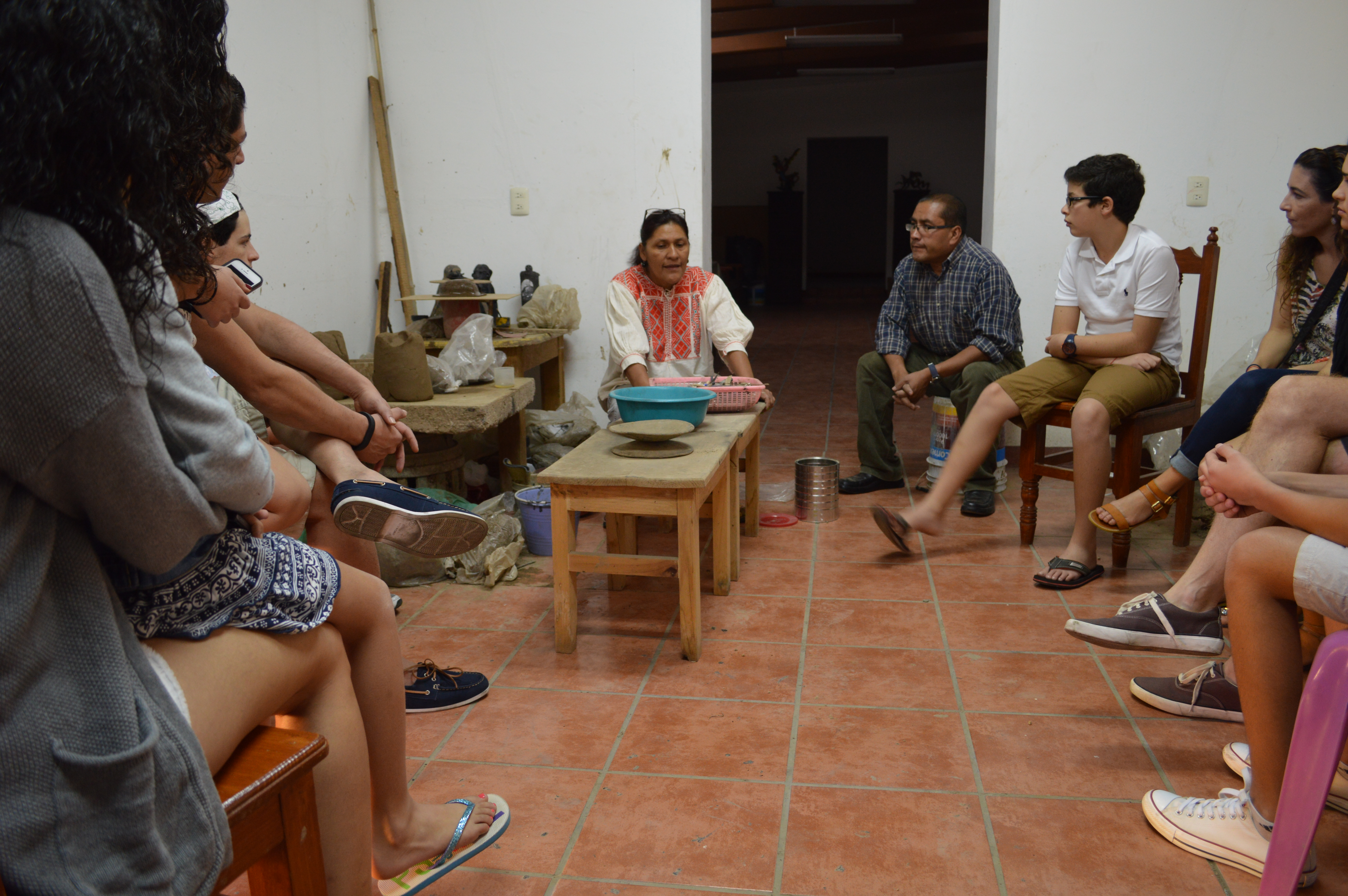
Carlomagno and sister Adelina demonstrating barro negro pottery to visitors at the family workshop in San Bartolo Coyotepec

His first exhibition was in 1983 at the Capilla del Hotel Presidente in Oaxaca city in 1983. In 1985, his work was at the Taller de Artes Plásticas Rufino Tamayo Gallery, and two galleries in Mexico City. In 1988, his work appeared at the Encuentro Nacional de Arte Joven in Aguascalientes. In 1990, his work appeared at Galería de la Raza in San Francisco. In 1995, it appeared at the Mexican consulate in Hamburg, Germany. In 1996, a sculpture group called El mal de amores “ in an expositions called “Enfermo de qué”, related to the origin of disease, toured Europe. In 2002, it appeared at the Parc de la Villette in Paris and the Fine Arts Centre Museum in Chicago. In 2006, it appeared at the Texas Gallery in Houston and the Boston Arts Academy. In 2007, it appeared in the Gardiner Museum in Toronto. In 2008, it appeared at the Friends of Oaxaca Folk Art New York. In 2008, he created a large mural in barro negro at the Baseball Academy in San Bartolo Coyotepec, which was sponsored b the Alfredo Harp Helú Foundation. In 2010, it appeared at the Galerìa Arte Contemporàneo Noel Cayetano in Oaxaca.

== Recognition ==
His work has received recognitions such as First Place in Sculpture, Gran Premio de Arte Popular in Querétaro in 1986, Premio Nacional de la Juventud en Artes Populares in 1988. His work has been featured in five published catalogs. In 2014, Mexico awarded Martinez its National Prize for Arts and Sciences in the popular arts and traditions category.

== MEAPO ==
He is currently the director of the Museo Estatal de Arte Popular de Oaxaca (MEAPO) in his hometown, a museum dedicated to the handcrafts of the state of Oaxaca, especially those in the Central Valleys region. He was one of the main actors in the founding of this museum in its current form in the 2000s.
